= List of plants that are extinct in the wild =

- Extinct in the wild (EW): 46 species
- Critically endangered (CR): 6,445 species
- Endangered (EN): 12,707 species
- Vulnerable (VU): 10,596 species
- Near threatened (NT, LR/cd): 4,880 species
- Least concern (LC): 35,732 species
- Data deficient (DD): 6,317 species
Plant species (IUCN, 2025.2)
- 76,864 extant species have been evaluated
- 70,547 of those are fully assessed (Note: excludes data deficient evaluations.)
- 40,612 are not threatened at present
- 29,935 are threatened (Note: Threatened comprises CR, EN and VU.)
- 187 to 892 are extinct or extinct in the wild:
  - 141 extinct (EX) species (Note: Chart omits extinct (EX) species)
  - 46 extinct in the wild (EW)
  - 648 possibly extinct [CR(PE)]
  - 57 possibly extinct in the wild [CR(PEW)]

As of June 2026, the International Union for Conservation of Nature (IUCN) lists 46 Extinct in the Wild plant species. Approximately 0.068% of all evaluated plant species are listed as extinct in the wild. The IUCN also lists one plant subspecies as extinct in the wild.

This is a complete list of extinct in the wild plant species and subspecies as evaluated by the IUCN. All are vascular plants (tracheophytes).

== Class Polypodiopsida - ferns ==
There is only one species of fern listed as Extinct in the Wild:

- Diplazium laffanianum, Governor Laffan's fern

== Class Cycadopsida - cycads ==
There are 5 species of cycad listed as Extinct in the Wild:

- Encephalartos brevifoliolatus, Escarpment cycad
- Encephalartos heenanii, Heenan's Cycad
- Encephalartos nubimontanus, Blue cycad
- Encephalartos relictus, Parlota cycad
- Encephalartos woodii, Wood's cycad

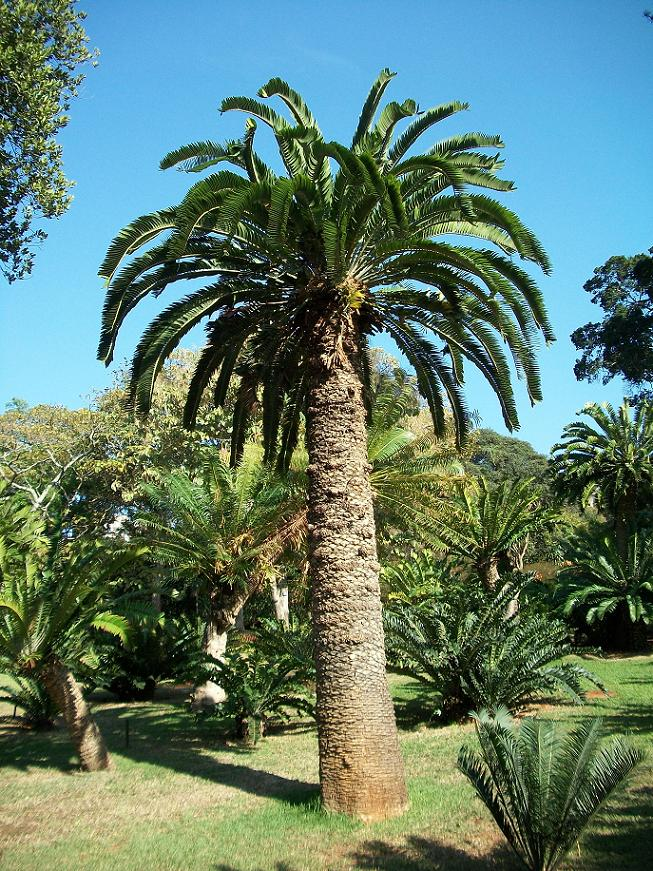
Encephalartos woodii is known only from its type specimen, which was discovered in 1895.

== Class Magnoliopsida - flowering plants ==
There are 32 species and 1 subspecies of class Magnoliopsida listed as Extinct in the Wild, including all 7 currently assessed Brugmansia species.

- Abutilon pitcairnense, Yellow Fatu
- Aechmea serrata
- Alphonsea hortensis
- Amherstia nobilis
- Arachis rigonii
- Brighamia insignis, ʻālula
- Brugmansia arborea
- Brugmansia aurea
- Brugmansia insignis
- Brugmansia sanguinea
- Brugmansia suaveolens
- Brugmansia versicolor
- Brugmansia vulcanicola
- Camellia amplexicaulis
- Clianthus puniceus
- Cyanea pinnatifida
- Cyanea superba, Superb Cyanea
- Cyanea superba subsp. superba
- Cyrtandra waiolani, Fuzzyflower Cyrtandra
- Dendroseris gigantea, Colecillo
- Deppea splendens
- Dombeya rodriguesiana, Bois Julien
- Erythroxylum echinodendron
- Euphorbia mayurnathanii
- Franklinia alatamaha, Franklin Tree
- Kalanchoe fadeniorum
- Kokia cookei
- Lachanodes arborea, She Cabbage Tree
- Lysimachia minoricensis
- Mangifera casturi, Kalimantan Mango
- Ochrosia brownii
- Rhododendron kanehirai
- Senecio leucopeplus
- Sophora toromiro, Toromiro
- Trochetiopsis erythroxylon, St Helena Redwood

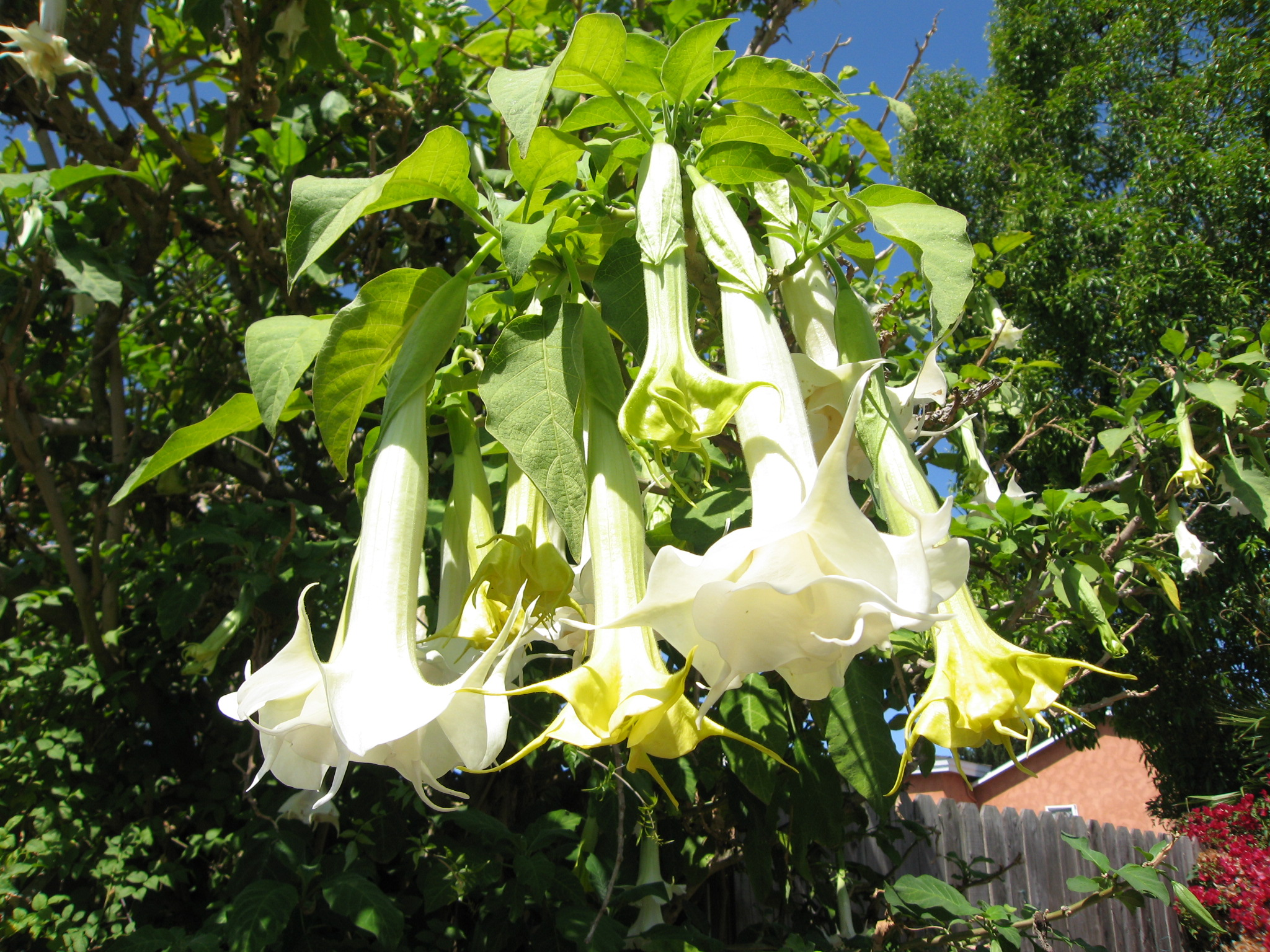
All currently assessed Brugmansia species have been listed as Extinct in the Wild, however, they are popular ornamental plants that have been cultivated around the world.

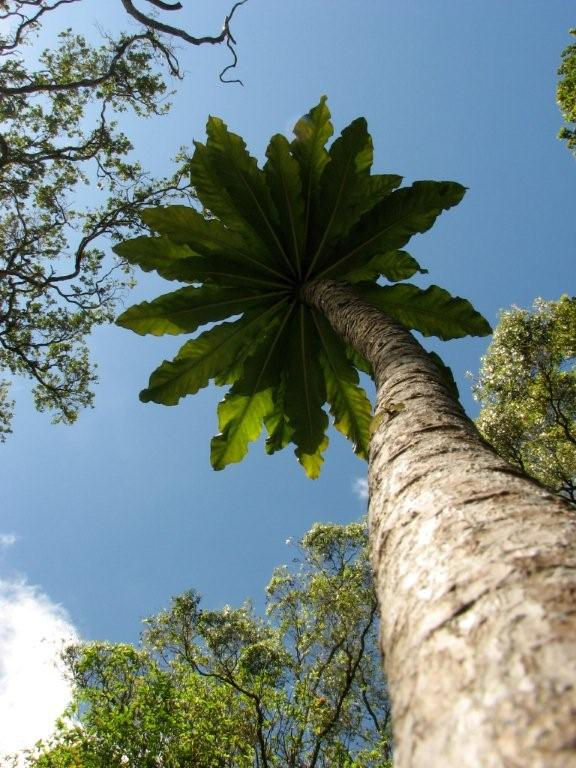
Cyanea superba was once found on the island of O'ahu, Hawaii until it became Extinct in the Wild, mainly due to competition and habitat destruction from invasive species and wildfires generated by human activity.

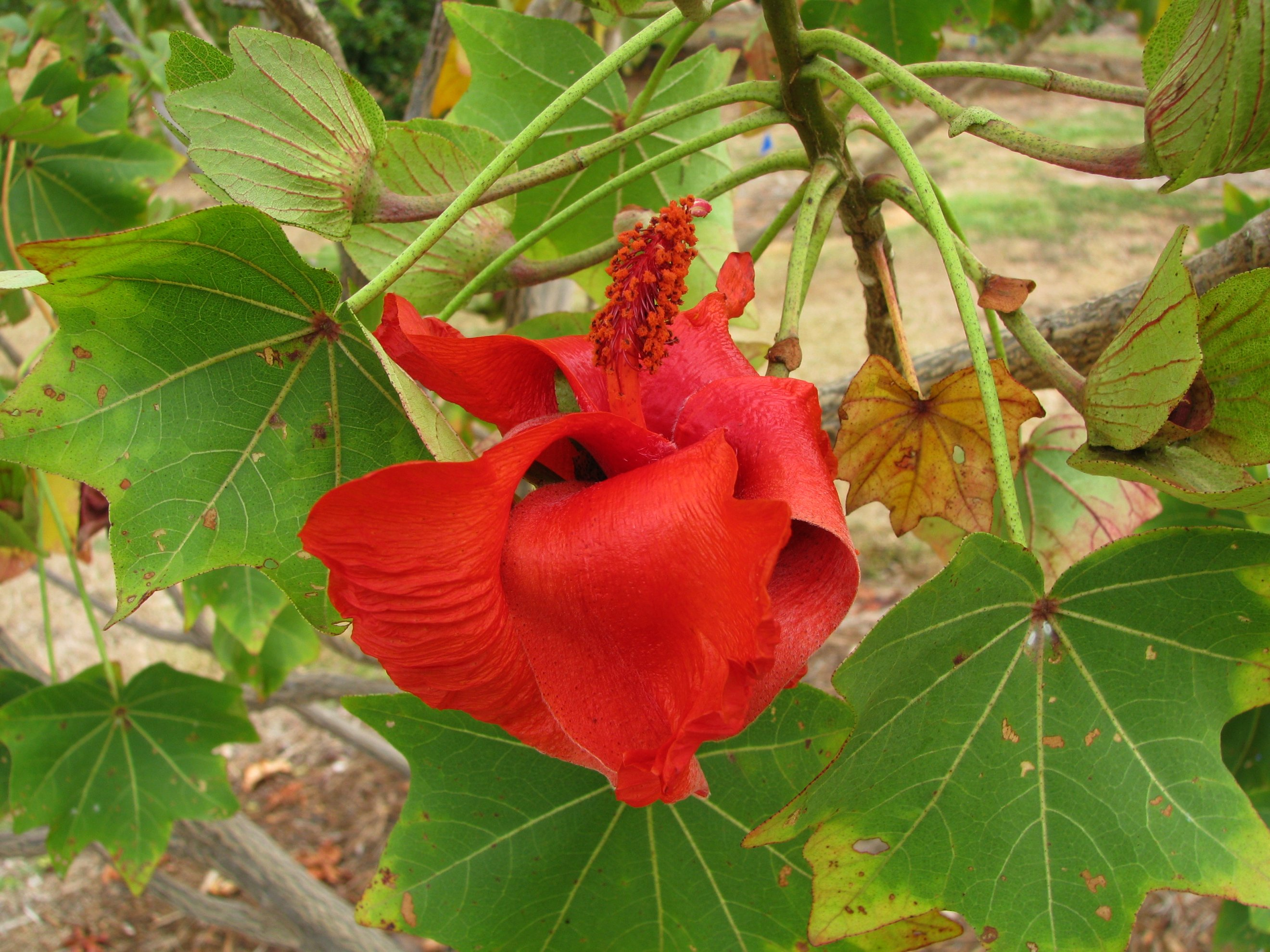
The extinction in the wild of Kokia cookei is largely believed to be a coextinction with native nectivorous birds, which may have pollinated it.

== Class Liliopsida - flowering plants ==
There are 7 species of Liliopsida listed as Extinct in the Wild.

- Agave lurida
- Aloe silicicola
- Amomum sumatranum
- Bromus bromoideus
- Bromus interruptus
- Corypha taliera
- Furcraea macdougallii

== See also ==
- List of extinct in the wild animals
- List of least concern plants
- List of near threatened plants
- List of vulnerable plants
- List of endangered plants
- List of critically endangered plants
- List of recently extinct plants
- List of data deficient plants
