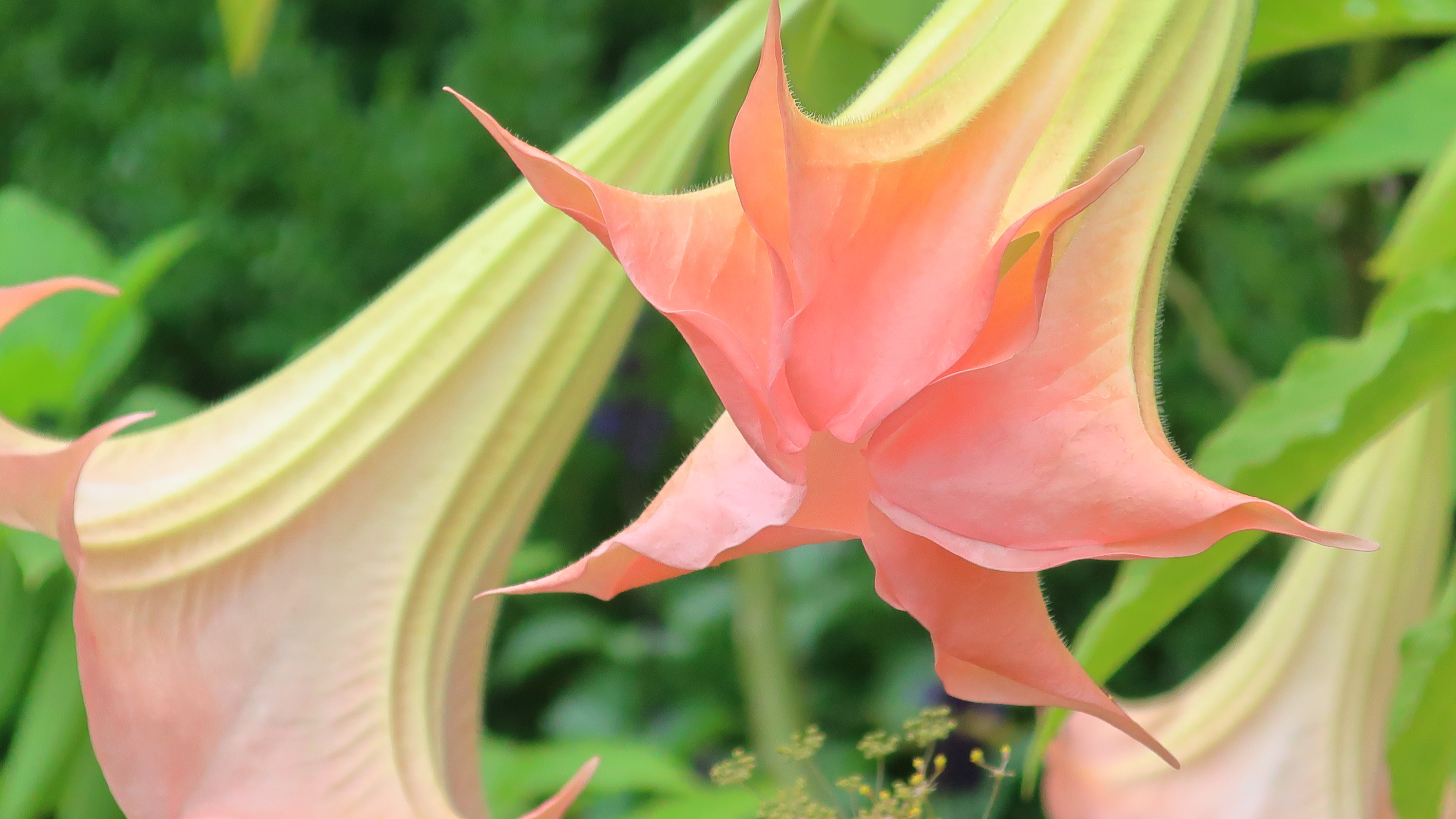
- At the Chicago Botanic Garden
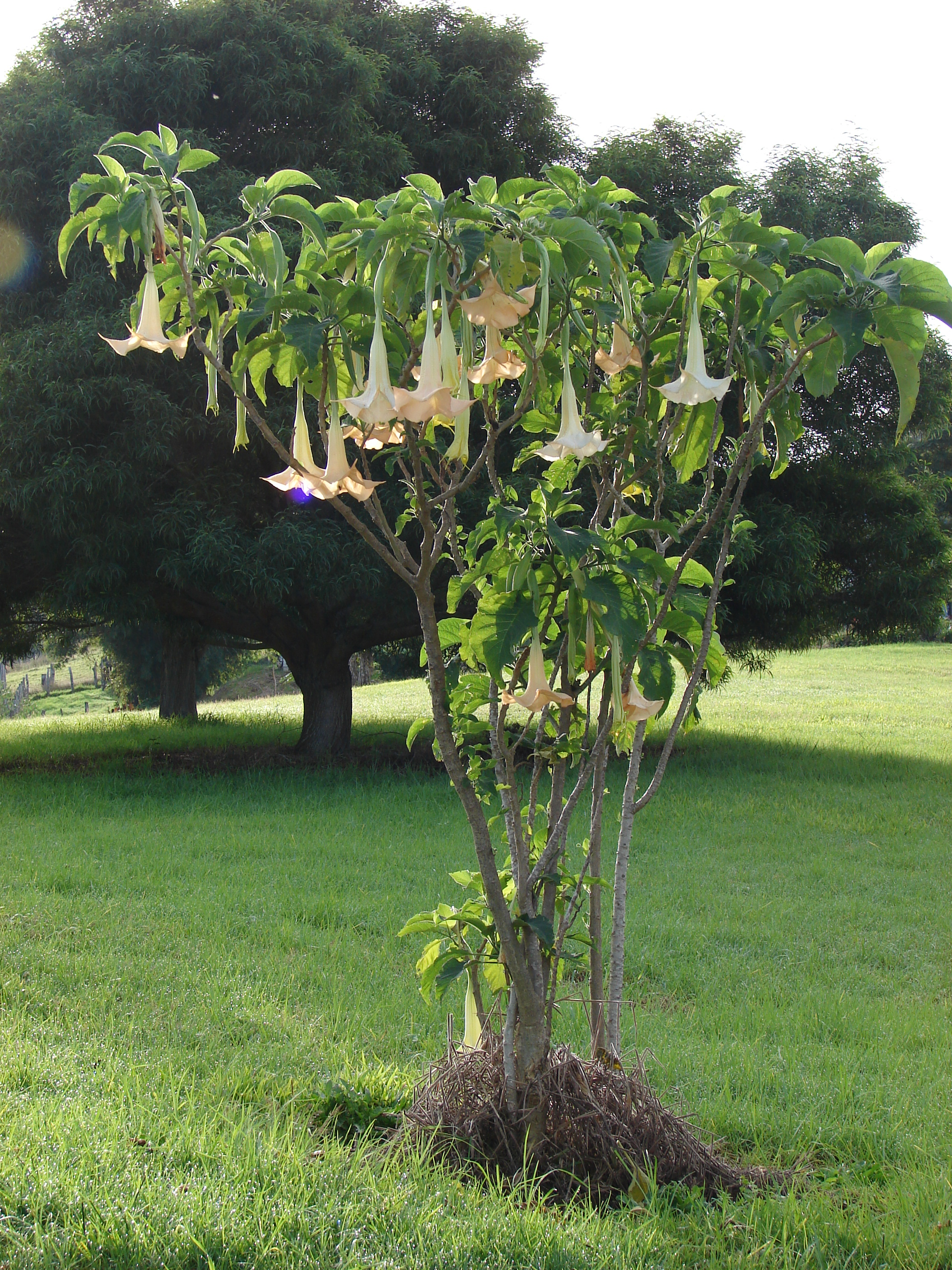
- Habit

Scientific classification
- Kingdom: Plantae
- Clade: Tracheophytes
- Clade: Angiosperms
- Clade: Eudicots
- Clade: Asterids
- Order: Solanales
- Family: Solanaceae
- Genus: Brugmansia
- Section: Brugmansia sect. Brugmansia
- Species: B. × candida

Binomial name
- Brugmansia × candida Pers.

Synonyms
- List: Brugmansia × amesiana (R.E.Schult.) D'Arcy; Brugmansia × amesianum (R.E.Schult.) D'Arcy; Brugmansia × knightii Bosse; Brugmansia × mollis (Saff.) Moldenke; Brugmansia suaveolens var. flore-duplici Voss; Datura × candida (Pers.) Voigt; Datura cornigera var. flore-pleno J.Fraser & Hemsl.; Datura cornigera var. knightii (Bosse) G.Nicholson; Datura × knightii (Bosse) Glenny; Datura × mollis Saff.; Datura suaveolens var. knightii (Bosse) J.Fraser & Hemsl.; Methysticodendron × amesianum R.E.Schult.

= Brugmansia × candida =

Species of plant

Brugmansia × candida (syn. Datura × candida), also known as angel's trumpet or moonflower, is a hybrid species of flowering plant in the family Solanaceae. Its parents are Brugmansia aurea and Brugmansia versicolor, with both listed as extinct in the wild.

Brugmansia × candida is native to Colombia and Ecuador, and has been introduced to tropical locations worldwide. A large shrub or small tree reaching at most 6 m (20 ft), it is typically found in the seasonally dry tropics. Its cultivars 'Angels Sunbeam', 'Creamsickle', 'Grand Marnier', and 'Knightii' have all gained the Royal Horticultural Society's Award of Garden Merit as ornamentals.

== Cultivation ==
It does best in warmer, frost-free regions. It should be watered regularly, especially in drier regions. Planted in well-drained, rich soil, in sunny or semi-shaded areas. In windy or colder regions, it is recommended to plant it in a sheltered space.
