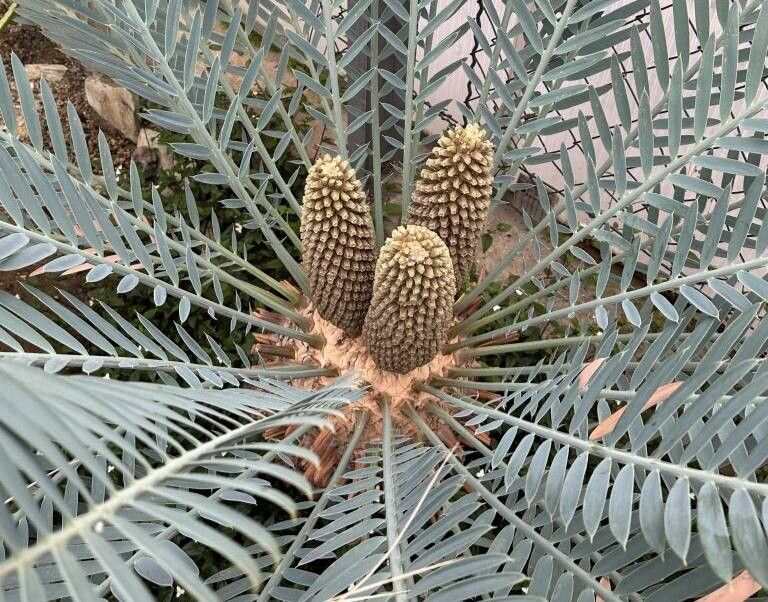
- An Encephalartos heenanii plant

Conservation status
- Extinct in the Wild (IUCN 3.1)
- CITES Appendix I (CITES)

Scientific classification
- Kingdom: Plantae
- Clade: Tracheophytes
- Clade: Gymnospermae
- Division: Cycadophyta
- Class: Cycadopsida
- Order: Cycadales
- Family: Zamiaceae
- Genus: Encephalartos
- Species: E. heenanii

Binomial name
- Encephalartos heenanii R.A.Dyer

= Encephalartos heenanii =

Species of cycad

Encephalartos heenanii, or Heenan's cycad, is a species of cycad in Southern Transvaal Province, South Africa.

== Description ==
This plant is tree-like, reaching heights of up to 3 meters with a stem diameter of 25–35 cm. It often produces shoots or branches from its base. Its leaves are light green, 100–125 cm long, with a twisted, spiral spine and a curved upper part. The lanceolate leaflets, 12–15 cm long, are arranged oppositely on the rachis at a 45-80° angle with smooth, entire margins. The basal leaves are smaller but not reduced to spines. This species is dioecious, with male cones that are yellow, ovoid-shaped, 27–30 cm long, and 15–17 cm wide. Each plant can produce up to three male cones. Female cones are similar in shape, 23–30 cm long, and 17–18 cm in diameter. Typically, each plant produces only one female cone, but up to three can rarely occur. The seeds are oblong, 23–25 mm long, and covered by a red sarcotesta.

== See also ==
- List of plants that are extinct in the wild
