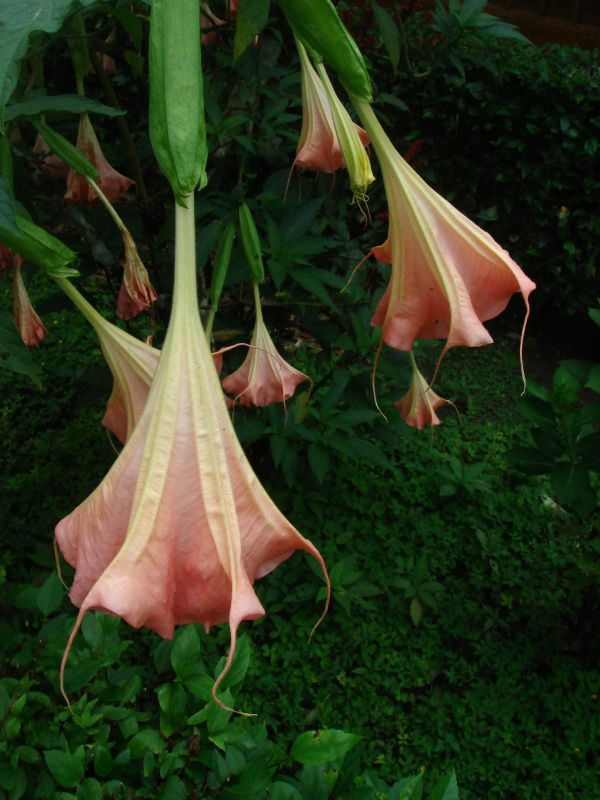

Conservation status
- Extinct in the Wild (IUCN 3.1)

Scientific classification
- Kingdom: Plantae
- Clade: Tracheophytes
- Clade: Angiosperms
- Clade: Eudicots
- Clade: Asterids
- Order: Solanales
- Family: Solanaceae
- Genus: Brugmansia
- Section: Brugmansia sect. Brugmansia
- Species: B. insignis

Binomial name
- Brugmansia insignis (Barb.Rodr.) Lockwood ex R.E.Schult.

Synonyms
- Datura insignis Barb.Rodr. Brugmansia longifolia Lagerh.

= Brugmansia insignis =

Species of plant

Brugmansia insignis is a South American species of angel's trumpet with large, fragrant flowers. The IUCN has listed this species as Extinct in the Wild, although like the other members of its genus its survival has been ensured by its popularity as an ornamental plant.

== Description ==
Brugmansia insignis are shrubs or small trees reaching up to 3 to 4 m (10 to 13 ft) in height. The large, nodding, funnel-shaped flowers come in shades of white and pink. The flowers have a shape very similar to Brugmansia suaveolens, but can be differentiated by their long corolla at the edge 3 to 6 cm (1.2 to 2.4 in), and by the very narrow, extra long tubular extension at the base of the flower corolla that is even longer than in B. suaveolens.

== Distribution ==
They are endemic to the upper Amazon region, at the eastern base of the Andes mountains of Peru.

== Toxicity ==
All parts of Brugmansia insignis are poisonous.
