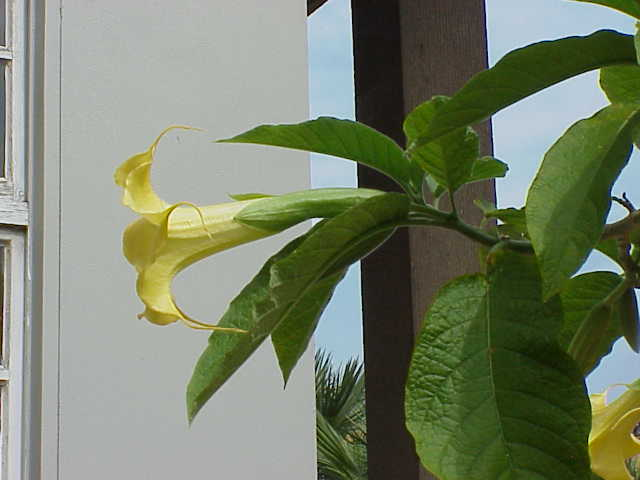

Conservation status
- Extinct in the Wild (IUCN 3.1)

Scientific classification
- Kingdom: Plantae
- Clade: Embryophytes
- Clade: Tracheophytes
- Clade: Spermatophytes
- Clade: Angiosperms
- Clade: Eudicots
- Clade: Asterids
- Order: Solanales
- Family: Solanaceae
- Genus: Brugmansia
- Section: Brugmansia sect. Brugmansia
- Species: B. aurea

Binomial name
- Brugmansia aurea Lagerh.
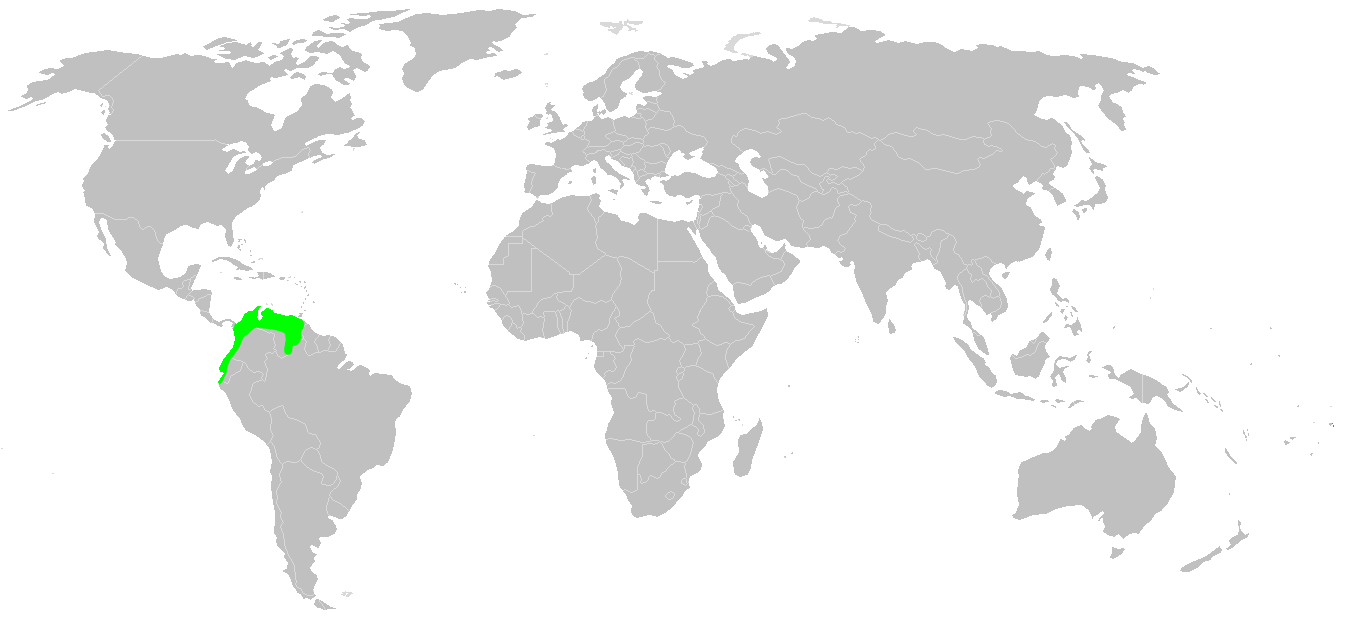

Synonyms
- Datura arborea var. aurea (Lagerh.) J.Fraser & Hemsl.; Brugmansia affinis (Saff.) Moldenke; Brugmansia pittieri (Saff.) Moldenke; Datura affinis Saff.; Datura aurea Lagerh.; Datura pittieri Saff.

= Brugmansia aurea =

Species of flowering plant

Brugmansia aurea, also known as golden angel's trumpet, is a species of flowering plant in the nightshade family Solanaceae that was native to Ecuador and Colombia, but is now Extinct in the Wild. Despite being declared extinct in its native range, Brugmansia aurea is a popular ornamental and is widely cultivated, like the other members of its genus.

== Description ==
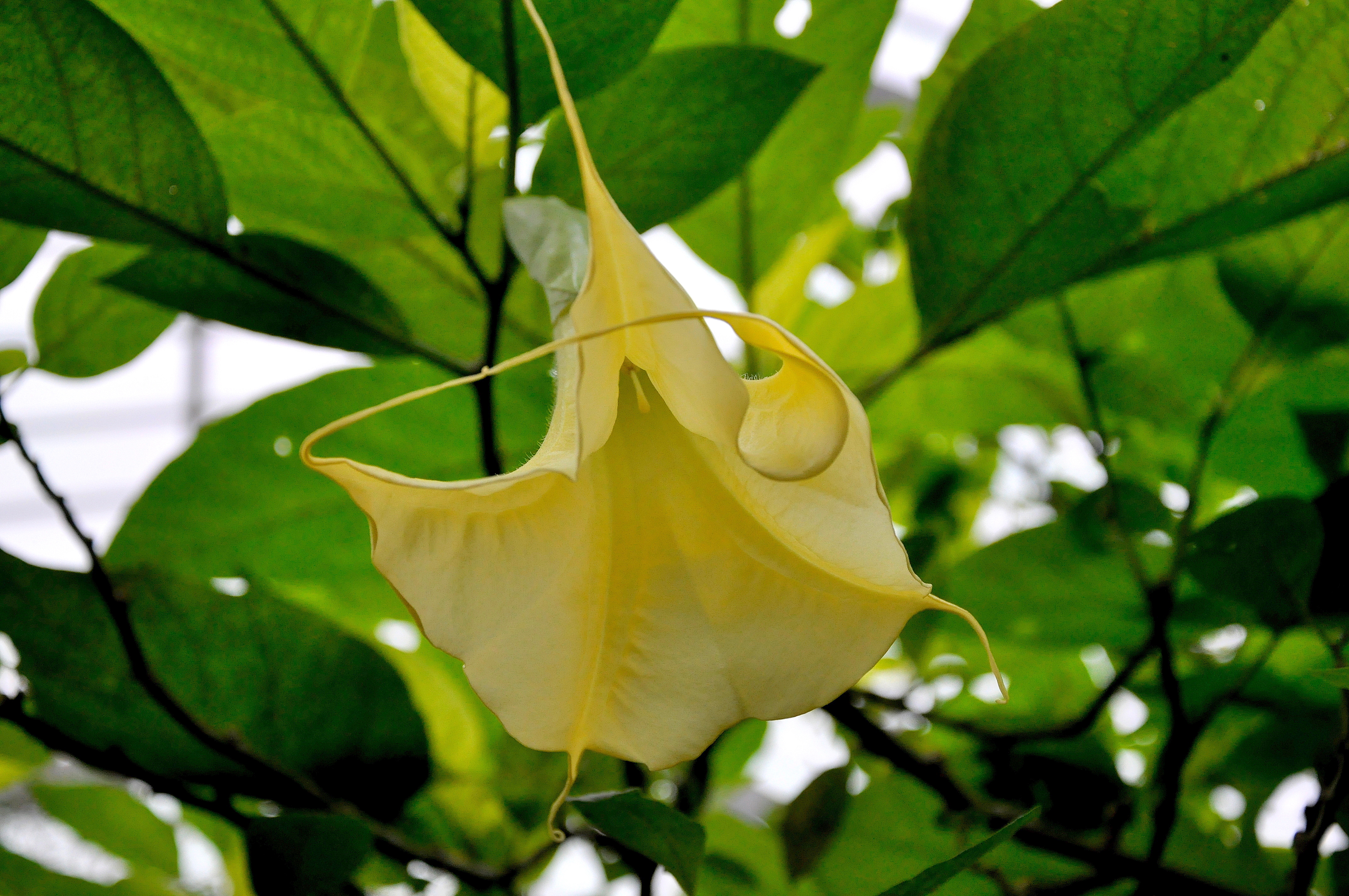
Brugmansia aurea cultivated in the Meise Botanic Garden

=== Vegetative characteristics ===
Brugmansia aurea is an up to 8 m tall shrub or small tree with spreading or drooping, almost smooth branches and smooth, grey bark. The leaves are glabrous or nearly glabrous.

=== Generative characteristics ===
The axillary, tubular, pendent, sulphur yellow to golden yellow, pleasantly fragrant, nectariferous flowers have 7–8 cm long, smooth pedicels. The tubular, 13–16 cm long calyx with a pubescent outer surface is divided into 2–5 lobes at the apex. The yellow, 15–18 cm long corolla bears five 5–6 cm long, recurved teeth. The stamens are 14.5 cm long.

== Taxonomy ==
Brugmansia aurea Lagerh. was published by Nils Gustaf Lagerheim in 1893. However, Brugmansia aurea Harrison had already been published by Harrison in 1837, making the later publication of Brugmansia aurea Lagerh. illegitimate. As Brugmansia aurea Lagerh. had been widely used, it was proposed to conserve it against Brugmansia aurea Harrison. It is placed in the section Brugmansia sect. Brugmansia.

=== Etymology ===
The specific epithet aurea means "golden".

== Distribution and habitat ==
It was native to the Andes from south-central Ecuador to northeast Colombia at elevations of 2000–3000 m above sea level. It grew mainly in Andean cloud forests and damp ravines with a subtropical mountainous climate, characterised by high humidity, moderate temperatures and frequent fog. It has been introduced into Italy, Rwanda, France (Southern Corsica), and Spain.

== Ecology ==
The very fragrant, trumpet-shaped flowers attract bees, butterflies, and birds. The flowers are pollinated by the hummingbird Ensifera ensifera. The floral tube is very often pierced by short-billed, nectar robbing hummingbirds.

== Conservation ==
No natural wild populations are known and Brugmansia aurea is now Extinct in the Wild. It is threatened by introgressive hybridisation with Brugmansia versicolor, via the hybrid Brugmansia × candida.

== Cultivation ==
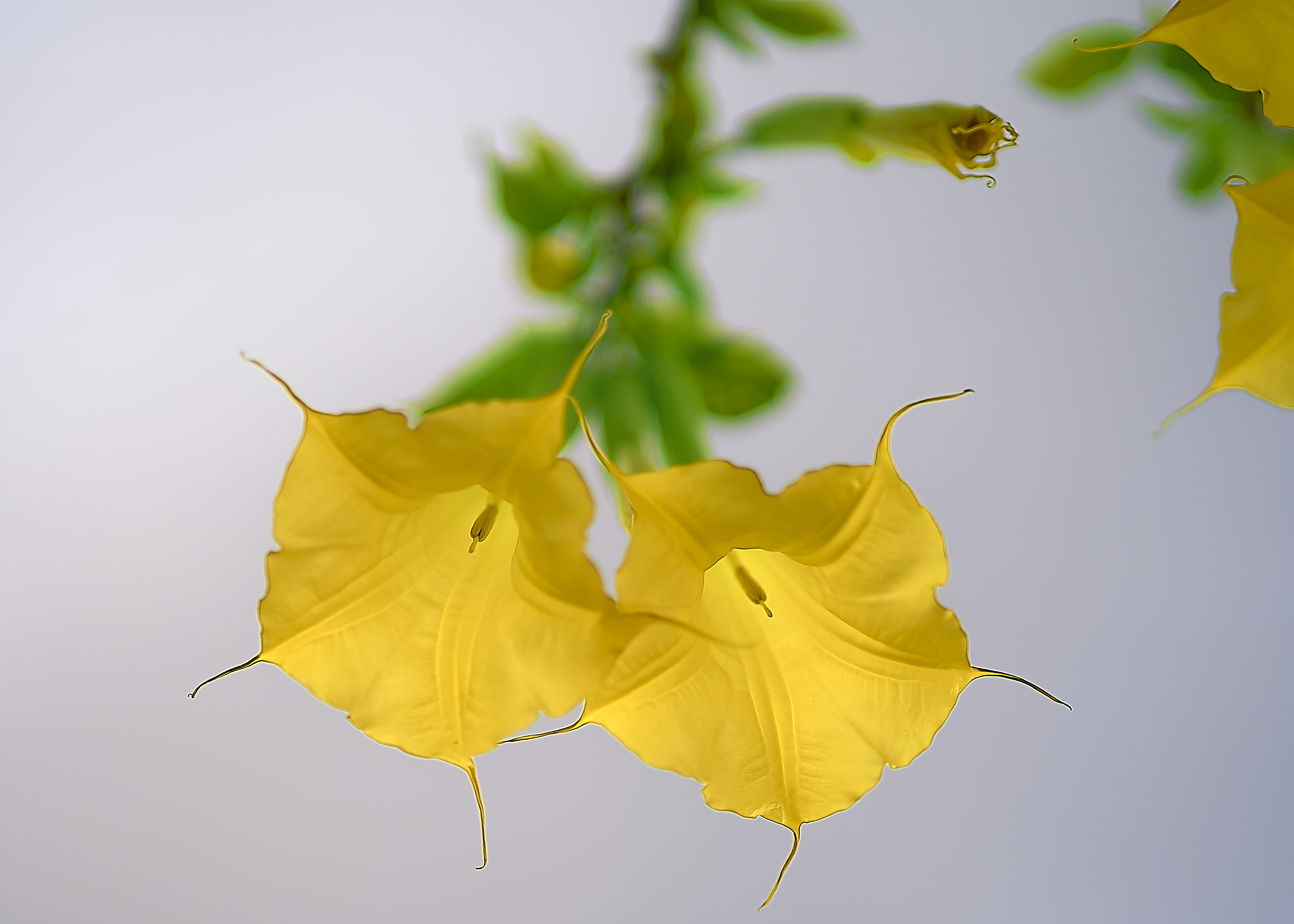
Two Brugmansia aurea seen from below

Brugmansia aurea is cultivated as an ornamental plant. Several cultivars exist, notably 'Grand Marnier' with peach-coloured flowers. As with other members of its genus, it cannot handle temperatures below 5 °C (41 °F), but in colder climates can be placed outside in a sheltered spot during the summer months.

== Toxicity ==
All parts of the plant are poisonous.

== Uses ==
It is used as a hallucinogen. Its most potent cultivar is Culebra Borrachero, which has a high concentration of the psychoactive scopolamine. It has also been used as a truth serum. Borrachero loosely translates to "get-you-drunk", and scopolamine is also known as Devil's Breath and burundanga.
