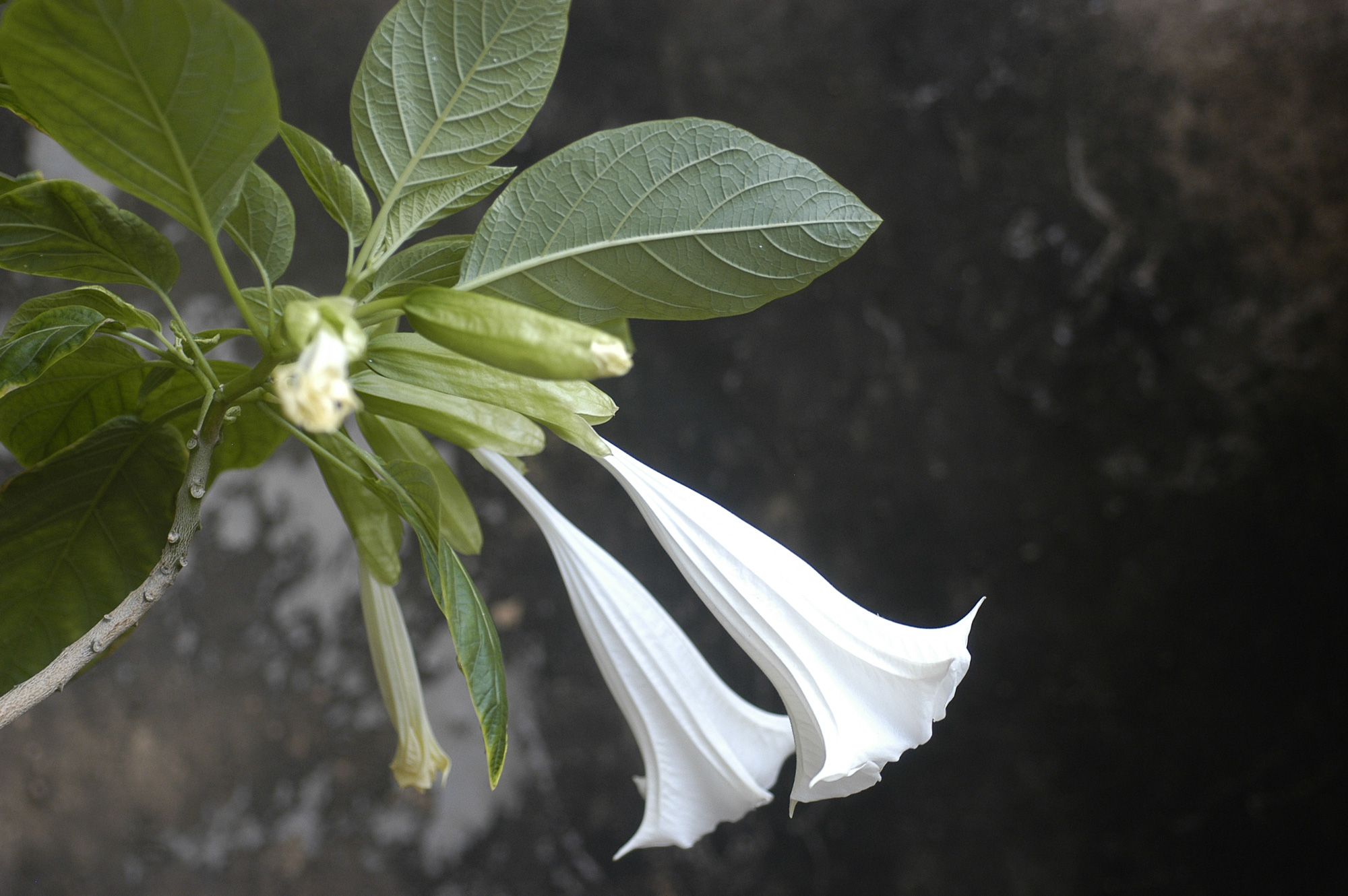
- Flowering Brugmansia suaveolens

Scientific classification
- Kingdom: Plantae
- Clade: Tracheophytes
- Clade: Angiosperms
- Clade: Eudicots
- Clade: Asterids
- Order: Solanales
- Family: Solanaceae
- Genus: Brugmansia
- Section: Brugmansia sect. Brugmansia

Type species
- Brugmansia × candida Pers.

Species
- See here.

= Brugmansia sect. Brugmansia =

Section of the genus Brugmansia in the family Solanaceae

Brugmansia sect. Brugmansia is a section within the genus Brugmansia in the family Solanaceae. It is sometimes referred to as the "Warm Group" Brugmansia.

== Description ==
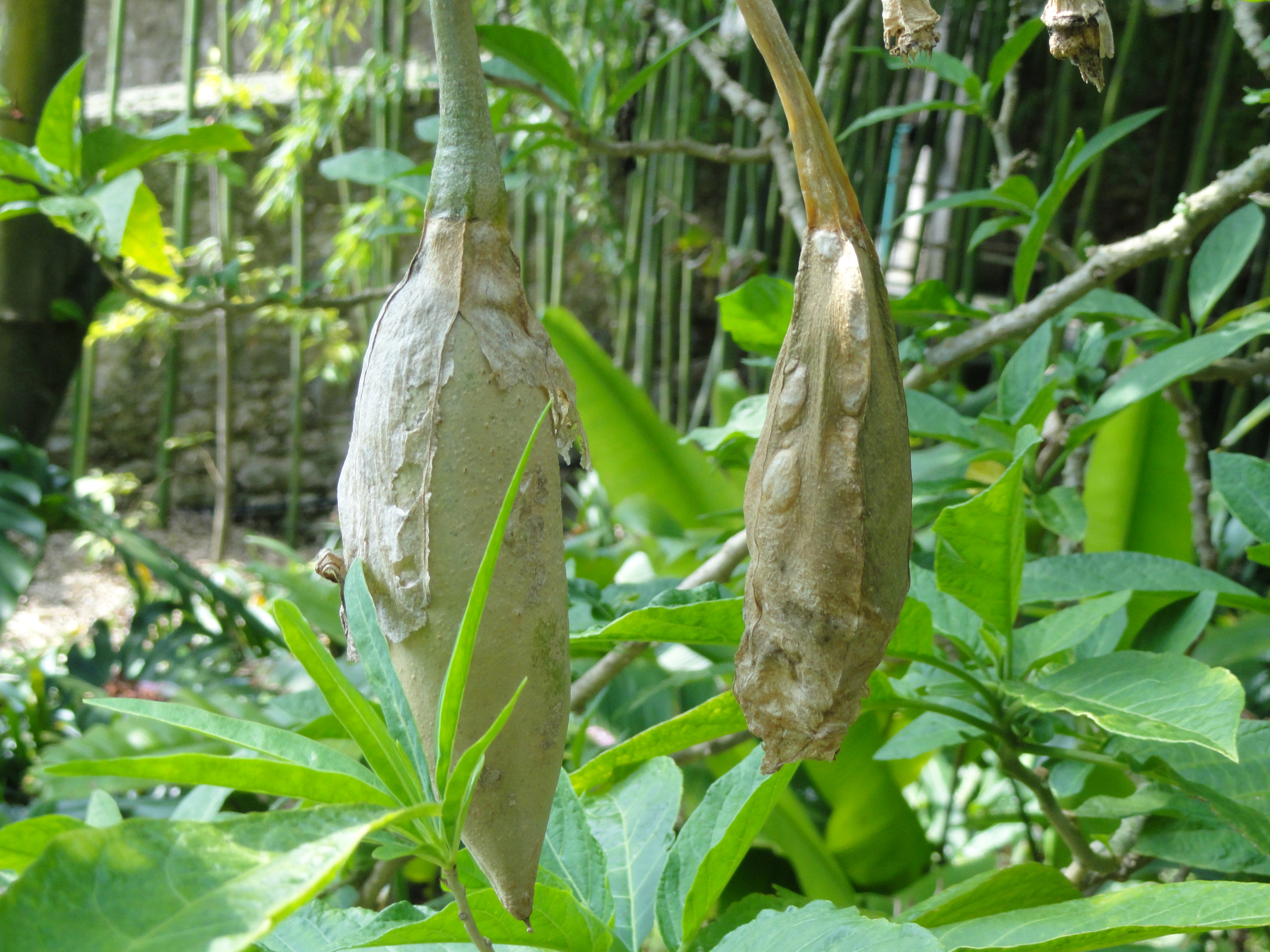
Brugmansia suaveolens fruit

The large, fragrant, nodding to pendent, funnelform flowers have a long stigma. The elongate, spindle-shaped fruits dry or persist fresh on the plant upon maturity. The seeds are corky.

== Taxonomy ==
=== Species ===
- Brugmansia aurea Lagerh.
- Brugmansia × candida Pers.
- Brugmansia insignis (Barb.Rodr.) Lockwood ex R.E.Schult.
- Brugmansia suaveolens (Humb. & Bonpl. ex Willd.) Sweet
- Brugmansia versicolor Lagerh.

== Distribution and habitat ==
The species of Brugmansia sect. Brugmansia occur at lower elevations than those of Brugmansia sect. Sphaerocarpum.

== Cultivation ==
Species of Brugmansia sect. Brugmansia are easier to cultivate than those of Brugmansia sect. Sphaerocarpum, as they are less sensitive to higher temperatures and viral disease. Hybridisation with species of section Brugmansia sect. Sphaerocarpum is practically impossible.
