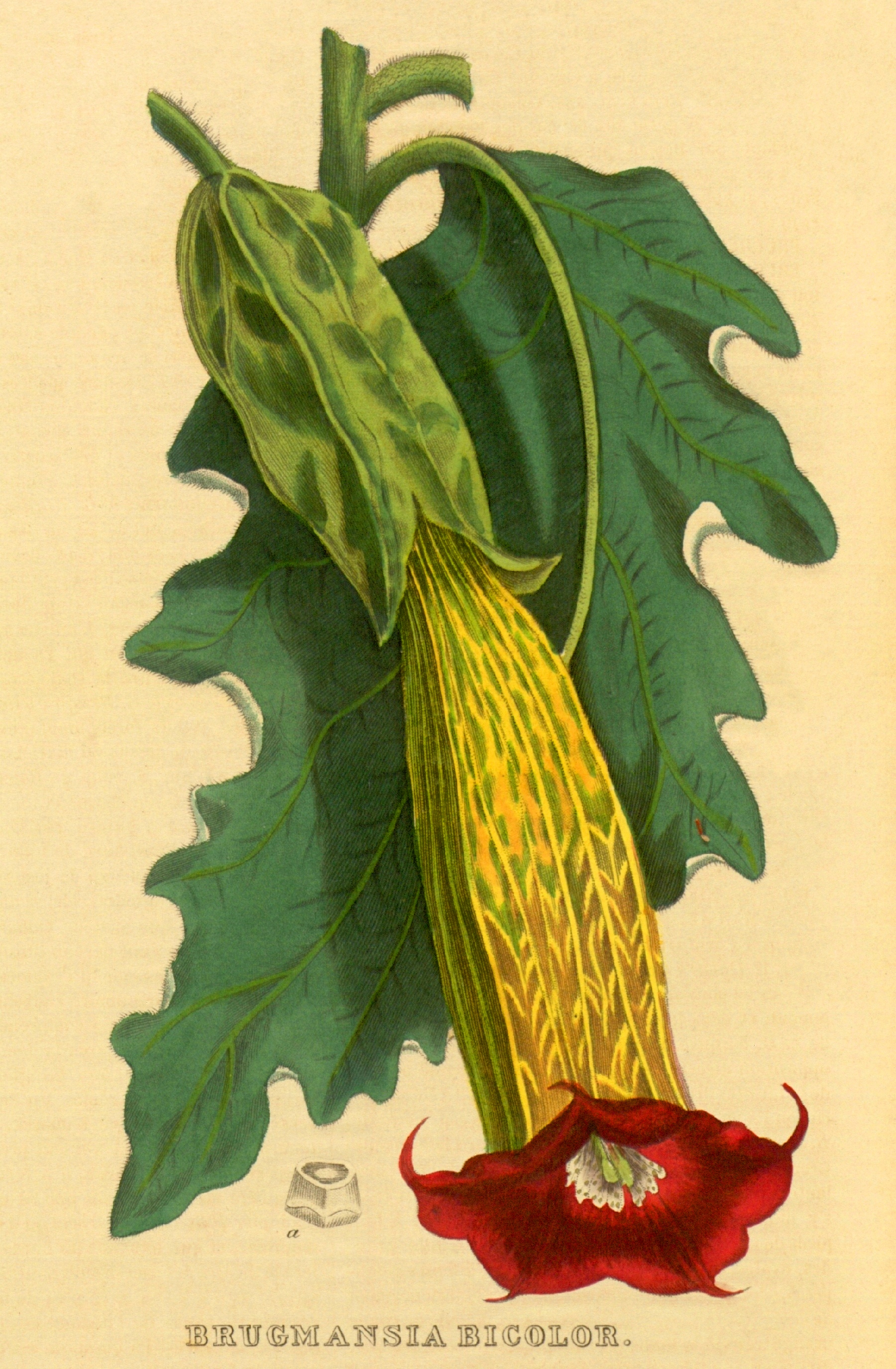
- Brugmansia sanguinea

Scientific classification
- Kingdom: Plantae
- Clade: Tracheophytes
- Clade: Angiosperms
- Clade: Eudicots
- Clade: Asterids
- Order: Solanales
- Family: Solanaceae
- Subfamily: Solanoideae
- Tribe: Datureae
- Genus: Brugmansia; Pers.

Species
- See here.

Synonyms
- Pseudodatura Zijp; Elisia Milano; Methysticodendron R.E.Schult.

= Brugmansia =

Genus of flowering plants in the nightshade family

Brugmansia is a genus of seven species of flowering plants in the nightshade family Solanaceae. They are woody trees or shrubs, with pendulous flowers, and have no spines on their fruit. Their large, fragrant flowers give them their common name of angel's trumpets, adjacent to the nickname devil's trumpets of the closely related genus Datura.

Brugmansia species are among the most toxic of ornamental plants, containing tropane alkaloids of the type also responsible for the toxicity and deliriant effects of both jimsonweed and the infamous deadly nightshade. All seven species are known only in cultivation or as escapees from cultivation, and no wild plants have ever been confirmed. They are therefore listed as Extinct in the Wild by the IUCN Red List, although they are popular ornamental plants and still exist wild outside their native range as introduced species. It is suspected that their extinction in the wild is due to the extinction of some animal that previously dispersed the seeds, with human cultivation having ensured the genus' continued survival.

== Description ==
Brugmansia are large shrubs or small trees, with semi-woody, often many-branched trunks. They can reach heights of 3–11 m (10–36 ft). The leaves are alternately arranged along the stems, generally large, 10–30 cm (4–12 in) long and 4–18 cm (2–7 in) across, with an entire or coarsely toothed margin, and are often covered with fine hairs. The name "angel's trumpet" refers to the large, pendulous, trumpet-shaped flowers, 14–50 cm (6–20 in) long and 10–35 cm (4–14 in) across at the opening. They come in shades of white, yellow, pink, orange, green, or red. Most have a strong, pleasing fragrance that is most noticeable in the evening. Flowers may be single, double, or more.

== Taxonomy ==
Linnaeus first classified these plants as part of Datura with his 1753 description of "Datura arborea". Then in 1805, C. H. Persoon transferred them into a separate genus, Brugmansia, named for Dutch naturalist Sebald Justinus Brugmans. For another 168 years, various authors placed them back and forth between the genera of Brugmansia and Datura, until in 1973, with his detailed comparison of morphological differences, T.E. Lockwood settled them as separate genera, where they have stayed unchallenged since. The genus Brugmansia is placed in the tribe Datureae.

=== Species ===
Currently, there are seven recognized species:

Section	Image	Scientific name	Distribution
Brugmansia sect. Brugmansia		Brugmansia aurea Lagerh.	Andes – Venezuela to Ecuador
Brugmansia sect. Brugmansia		Brugmansia insignis (Barb.Rodr.) Lockwood ex R.E.Schult.	Eastern Andes foothills – Colombia to Bolivia and occasionally Brazil
Brugmansia sect. Brugmansia		Brugmansia suaveolens (Willd.) Sweet	Southeast Brazil
Brugmansia sect. Brugmansia		Brugmansia versicolor Lagerh.	Ecuador
Brugmansia sect. Sphaerocarpum		Brugmansia arborea (L.) Sweet	Andes – Ecuador to northern Chile
Brugmansia sect. Sphaerocarpum		Brugmansia sanguinea (Ruiz & Pav.) D.Don	Andes – Colombia to northern Chile
Brugmansia sect. Sphaerocarpum		Brugmansia vulcanicola (A.S.Barclay) R.E.Schult.	Andes – Colombia to Ecuador

These species are then divided into two natural, genetically isolated groups. The section Brugmansia sect. Brugmansia (the warm-growing group) includes the species B. aurea, B. insignis, B. sauveolens, and B. versicolor. The section Brugmansia sect. Sphaerocarpum (the cold group) includes the species B. arborea, B. sanguinea, and B. vulcanicola.

Two of these species were challenged by Lockwood in his 1973 doctoral thesis. First, Brugmansia vulcanicola was said to be a subspecies of B. sanguinea, but this was refuted by Lockwood's former mentor, R. E. Schultes in 1977. Second, Lockwood proposed that the species B. insignis was instead a hybrid of the combination (B. suaveolens × B. versicolor) × B. suaveolens. This was later disproved by crossbreeding experiments done by the Preissels, published in 1997.

== Distribution and habitat ==
Brugmansia are native to tropical regions of South America, along the Andes from Venezuela to northern Chile, and also in south-eastern Brazil. They are grown as ornamental container plants worldwide, and have become naturalized in isolated tropical areas around the globe, including within North America, Africa, Australia, Asia, and Europe.

== Ecology ==
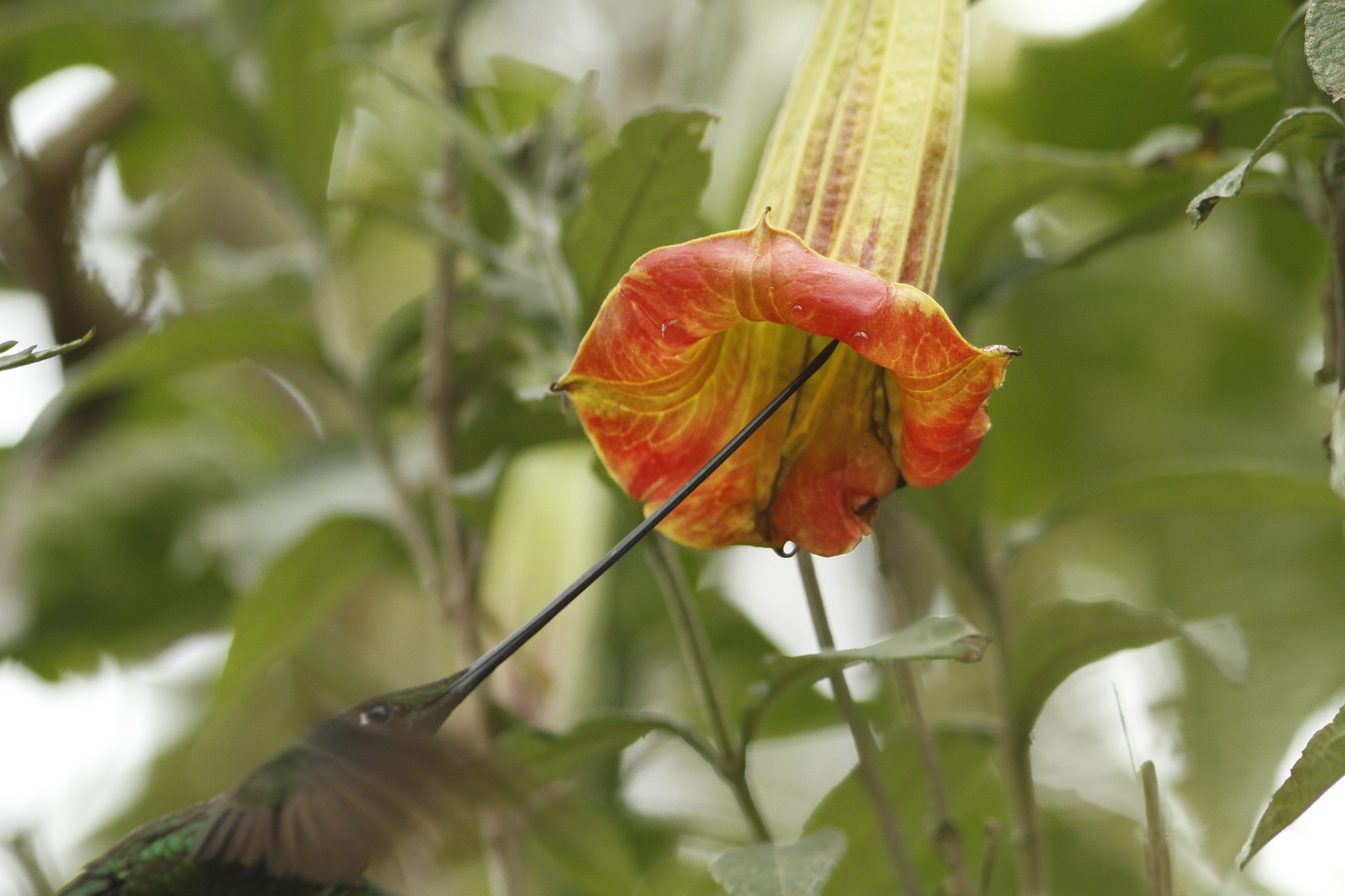

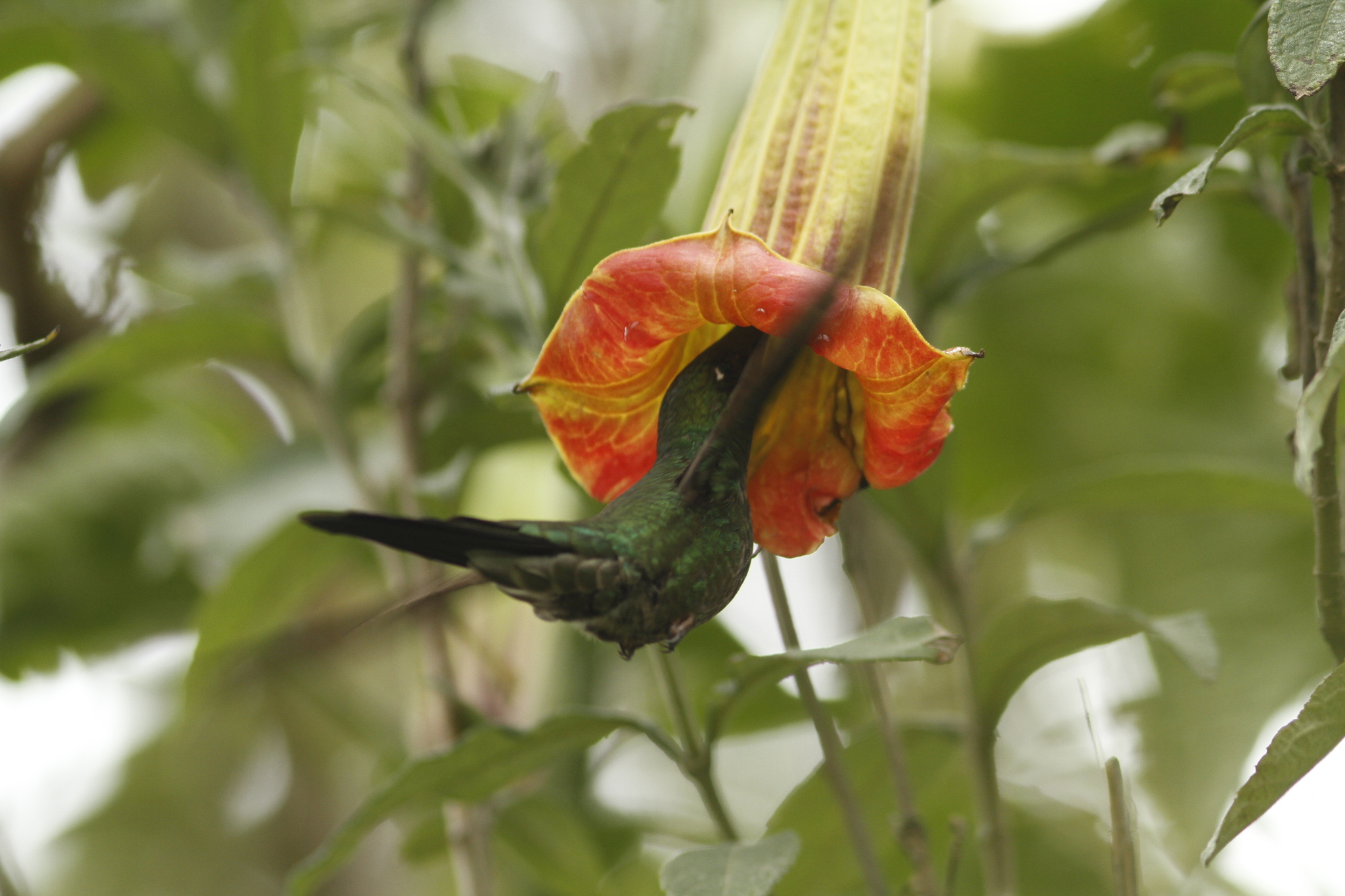
The sword-billed hummingbird is the exclusive pollinator of Brugmansia sanguinea.

Most Brugmansia are fragrant in the evenings to attract pollinating moths. One species lacking scent, the red-flowered Brugmansia sanguinea, is exclusively pollinated by the sword-billed hummingbird. Brugmansia have two main stages to their life cycle. In the initial vegetative stage the young seedling grows straight up, usually on a single stalk, until it reaches its first main fork at 80–150 cm (2.6–4.9 ft) high. It will not flower until after it has reached this fork, and then only on new growth above the fork. Cuttings taken from the lower vegetative region must also grow to a similar height before flowering, but cuttings from the upper flowering region will often flower at a very low height.

One example of plant/animal interaction involves the butterfly Placidula euryanassa, which uses Brugmansia suaveolens as one of its main larval foods. It has been shown that these can sequester the plant's tropane alkaloids and store them through the pupal stage on to the adult butterfly, where they are then used as a defense mechanism, making themselves less palatable to vertebrate predators.

Brugmansia seed dispersal was probably formerly accomplished by mammalian megafauna, extinct since the Pleistocene. Brugmansia has long been extinct in the wild as their fruits now shrivel on the plants without progeny. They have been maintained in cultivation as a source of psychotropic drugs, as well as for ornamental purposes, following the loss of their evolutionary seed dispersal partner by humans.

== Historical uses ==
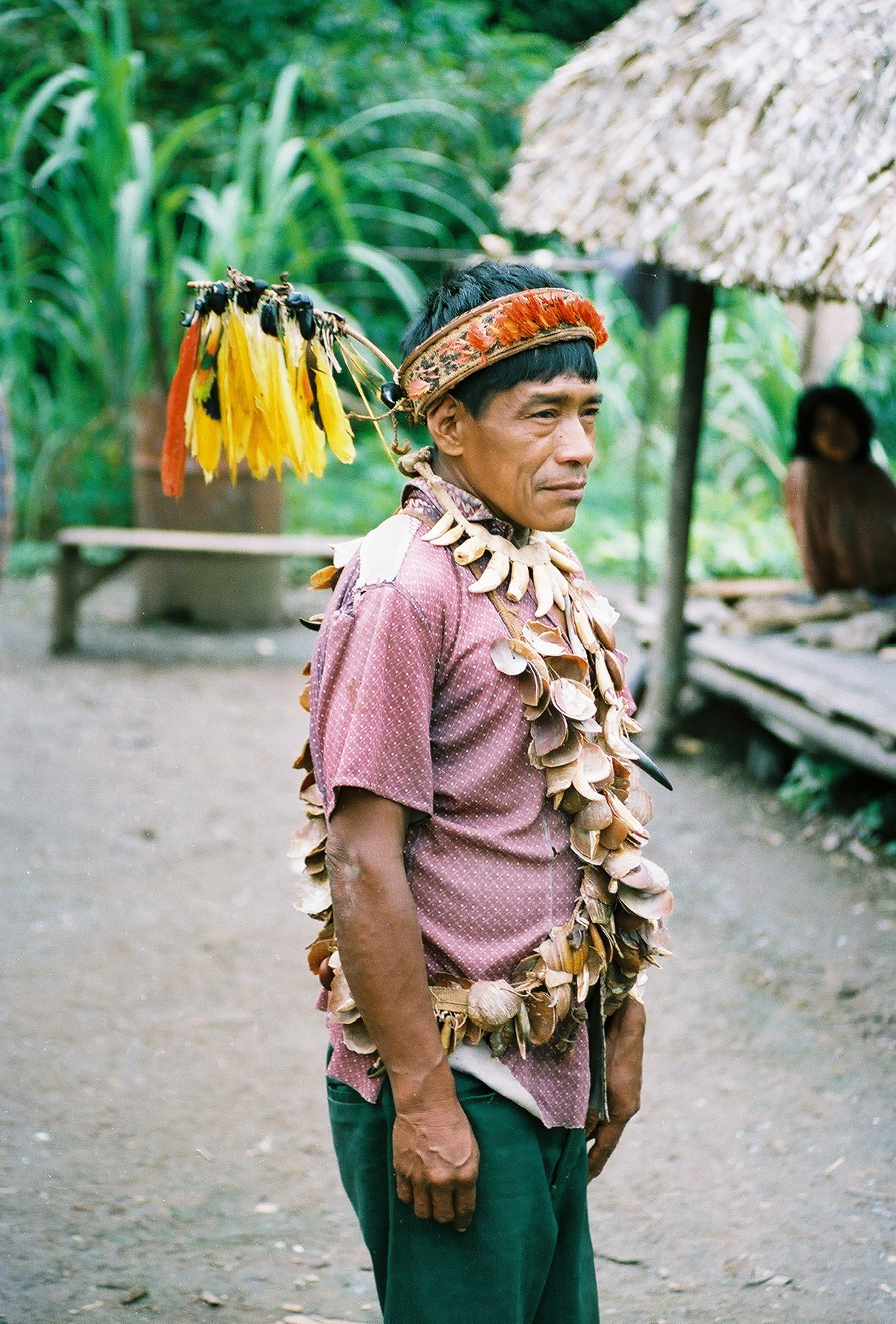
Urarina shaman, 1988. The Urarina use Brugmansia in their rituals.

Brugmansia contains deliriant hallucinogenic tropane alkaloids (atropine, scopolamine, and hyoscyamine), which cause delirium and hallucinations. In modern medicine, these tropane alkaloids found in Brugmansia and other related members of Solanaceae have proven medical value for their spasmolytic, anti-asthmatic, anticholinergic, narcotic, and anesthetic properties, although many of these alkaloids, or their equivalents, are now artificially synthesized.

Brugmansia species have also traditionally been used in many South American indigenous cultures in medical preparations and as an entheogen in religious and spiritual ceremonies. Medicinally, they have mostly been used externally as part of a poultice, tincture, ointment, or where the leaves are directly applied transdermally to the skin. Traditional external uses have included the treating of aches and pains, dermatitis, orchitis, arthritis, rheumatism, headaches, infections, and as an anti-inflammatory. They have been used internally much more rarely due to the inherent dangers of ingestion. Internal uses, in highly diluted preparations, and often as a portion of a larger mix, have included treatments for stomach and muscle ailments, as a decongestant, to induce vomiting, to expel worms and parasites, and as a sedative.

Several South American cultures have used Brugmansia species as a treatment for unruly children, so that they might be admonished directly by their ancestors in the spirit world, and thereby become more compliant. Mixed with maize beer and tobacco leaves, it has been used to drug wives and slaves before they were buried alive with their dead lord.

In the Northern Peruvian Andes, shamans (curanderos) traditionally used Brugmansia species for initiation, divination, and black magic rituals. In some Latin American countries such as Colombia and Peru, members of the genus Brugmansia are reportedly used by malevolent sorcerers or "bad shamans" in some ayahuasca brews in attempt to take advantage of tourists. The species that are typically used for these purposes include Brugmansia suaveolens and Brugmansia arborea among others.

== Toxicity ==
All parts of Brugmansia are potentially poisonous, with the seeds and leaves being especially dangerous. Brugmansia are rich in scopolamine (hyoscine), hyoscyamine, and several other tropane alkaloids that can lead to anticholinergic toxidrome and delirium. Effects of ingestion can include paralysis of smooth muscles, confusion, tachycardia, dry mouth, constipation, tremors, migraine headaches, poor coordination, delusions, visual and auditory hallucinations, mydriasis, rapid onset cycloplegia, and death.

The hallucinogenic effects of Brugmansia were described in the journal Pathology as "terrifying rather than pleasurable". The author Christina Pratt, in An Encyclopedia of Shamanism, says that "Brugmansia induces a powerful trance with violent and unpleasant effects, sickening after effects, and at times temporary insanity". These hallucinations are often characterized by complete loss of awareness that one is hallucinating, disconnection from reality (psychosis), and amnesia of the episode, such as one example reported in European Archives of Psychiatry and Clinical Neuroscience of a young man who amputated his own penis and tongue after drinking only one cup of Brugmansia sanguinea tea.

In 1994 in Florida, 112 people were admitted to hospitals after ingesting Brugmansia, leading one municipality to prohibit the purchase, sale, or cultivation of Brugmansia plants. The concentrations of alkaloids in all parts of the plant differ markedly. They even vary with the seasons and the level of hydration, so it is nearly impossible to determine a safe level of alkaloid exposure.

In 2022 The BMJ reported the following case: A woman in her 50s presented to the emergency department with blurred vision and pupil asymmetry for 3 hours. The right pupil was dilated, while the left was normal. A detailed history revealed that she had been pruning plants in her garden, when the blurred vision started. She did not complain of any other symptom. When all tests proved normal, she was finally asked to provide a photo of her garden. Brugmansia suaveolens (angel's trumpet) was identified in the picture. On asking specific history, she reported rubbing her right eye after touching the plant's leaves and flowers. Anecdotally, this case demonstrates the tendency for active compounds in Brugmansia plants to easily be transferred to the hands when handling the plant.

== Cultivation ==
Brugmansia are easily grown in a moist, fertile, well-drained soil, in sun to part shade, in frost-free climates. They begin to flower in mid to late spring in warm climates and continue into the fall (autumn), often continuing as late as early winter in warm conditions. In cool winters, outdoor plants need protection from frost, but the roots are hardier, and may resprout in late spring. The species from the higher elevations, in B. section Sphaerocarpium, prefer moderate temperatures and cool nights, and may not flower if temperatures are very hot. Most Brugmansia may be propagated easily by rooting 10–20 cm (4–8 in) cuttings taken from the end of a branch during the summer. Several hybrids and numerous cultivars have been developed for use as ornamental plants. B. × candida is a hybrid between B. aurea and B. versicolor; B. × flava is a hybrid between B. arborea and B. sanguinea; and B. × cubensis is a hybrid between B. suaveolens, B. versicolor, and B. aurea. There are cultivars producing double flowers, and some with variegated leaves. The cultivars B. × candida 'Grand Marnier' and 'Knightii' have gained the Royal Horticultural Society's Award of Garden Merit.

== Gallery ==
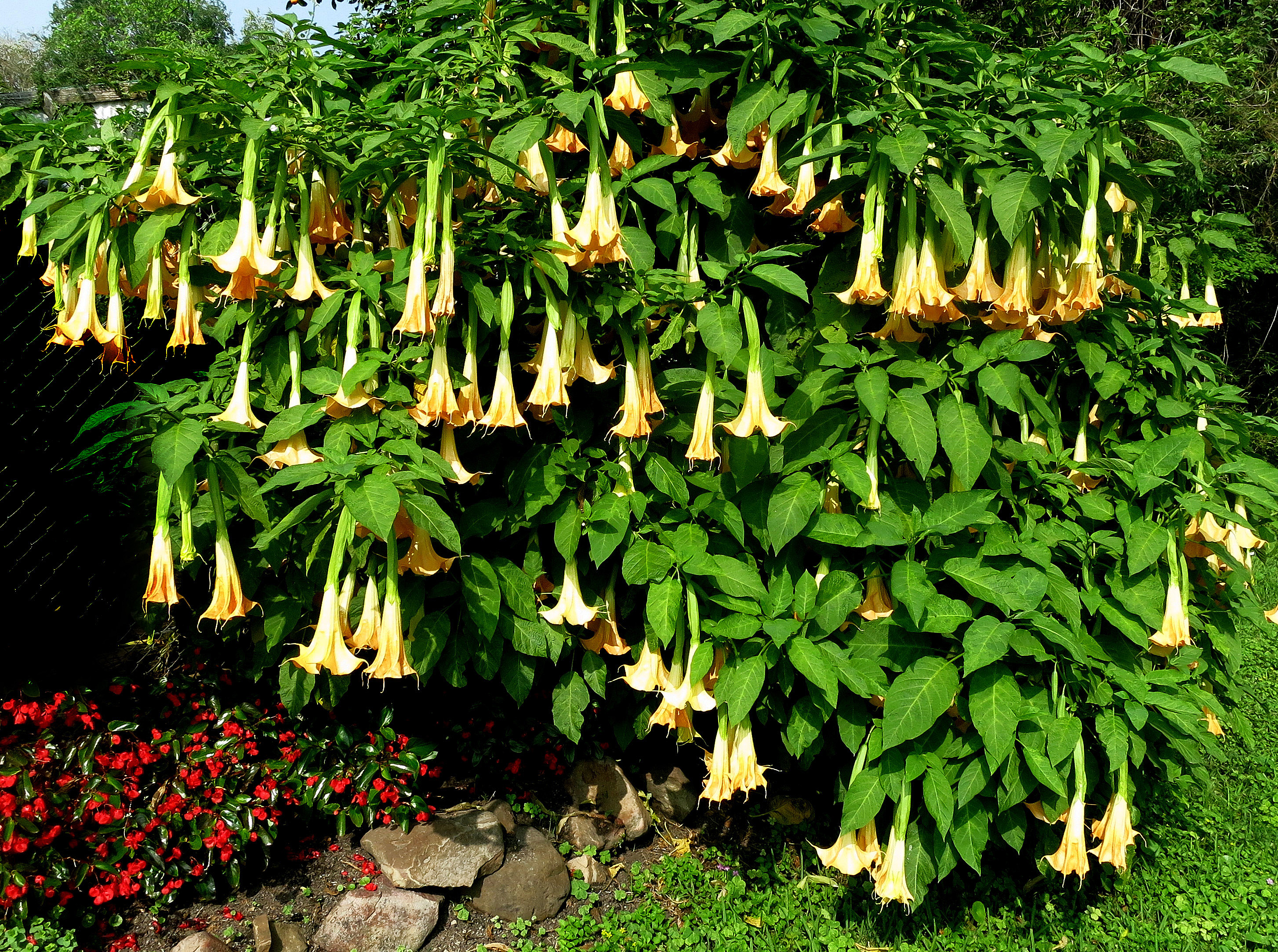
Angel trumpets shrub – Brugmansia suaveolens

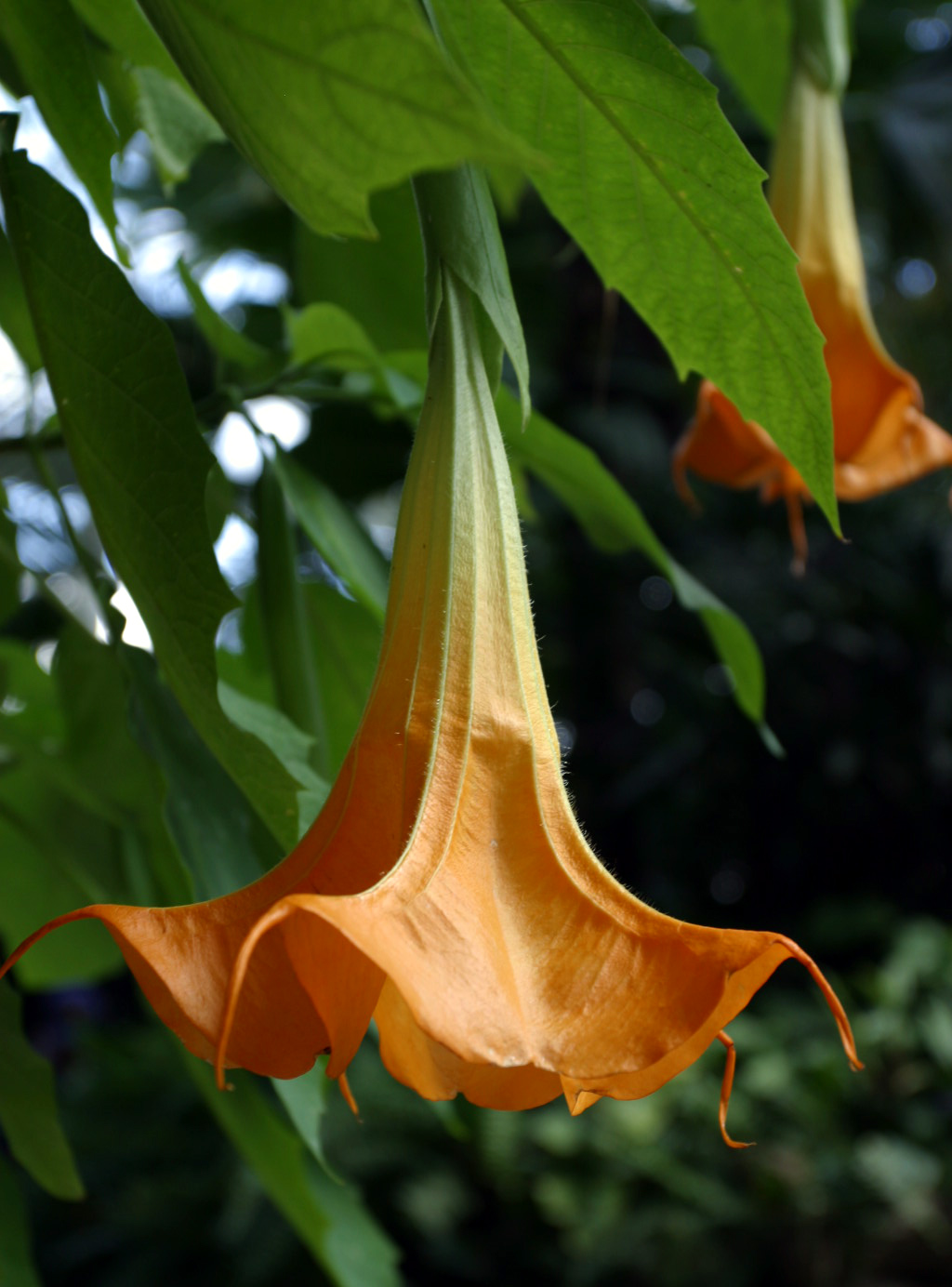
Brugmansia hybrid flower

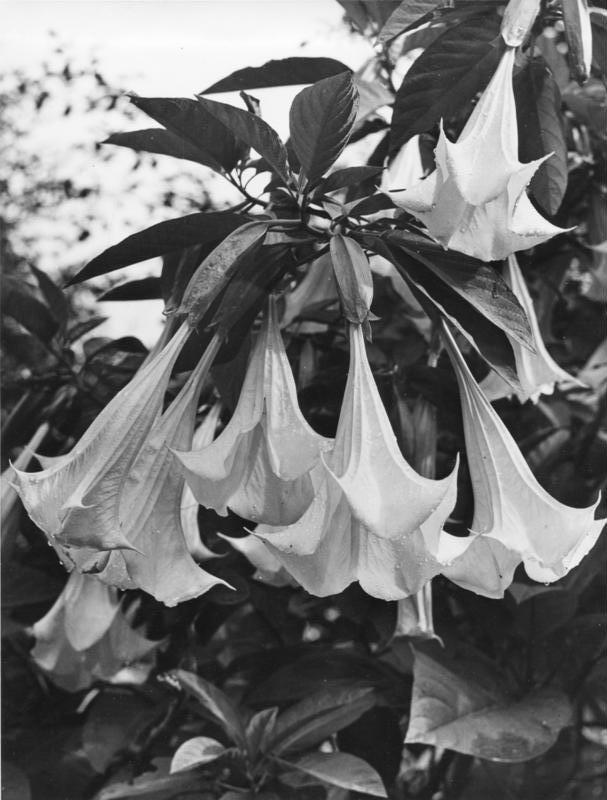
Brugmansia suaveolens

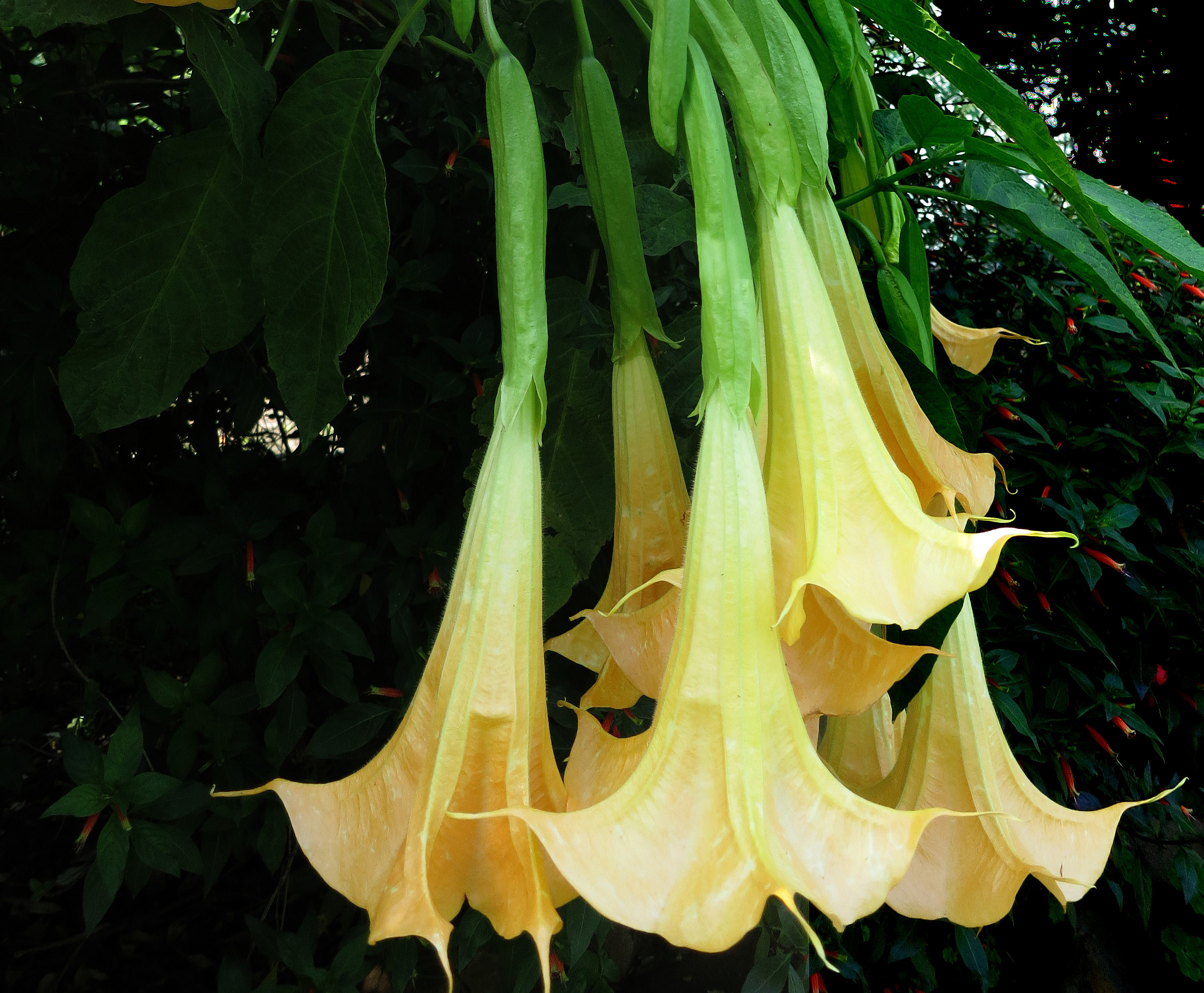
Angel trumpets – Brugmansia suaveolens

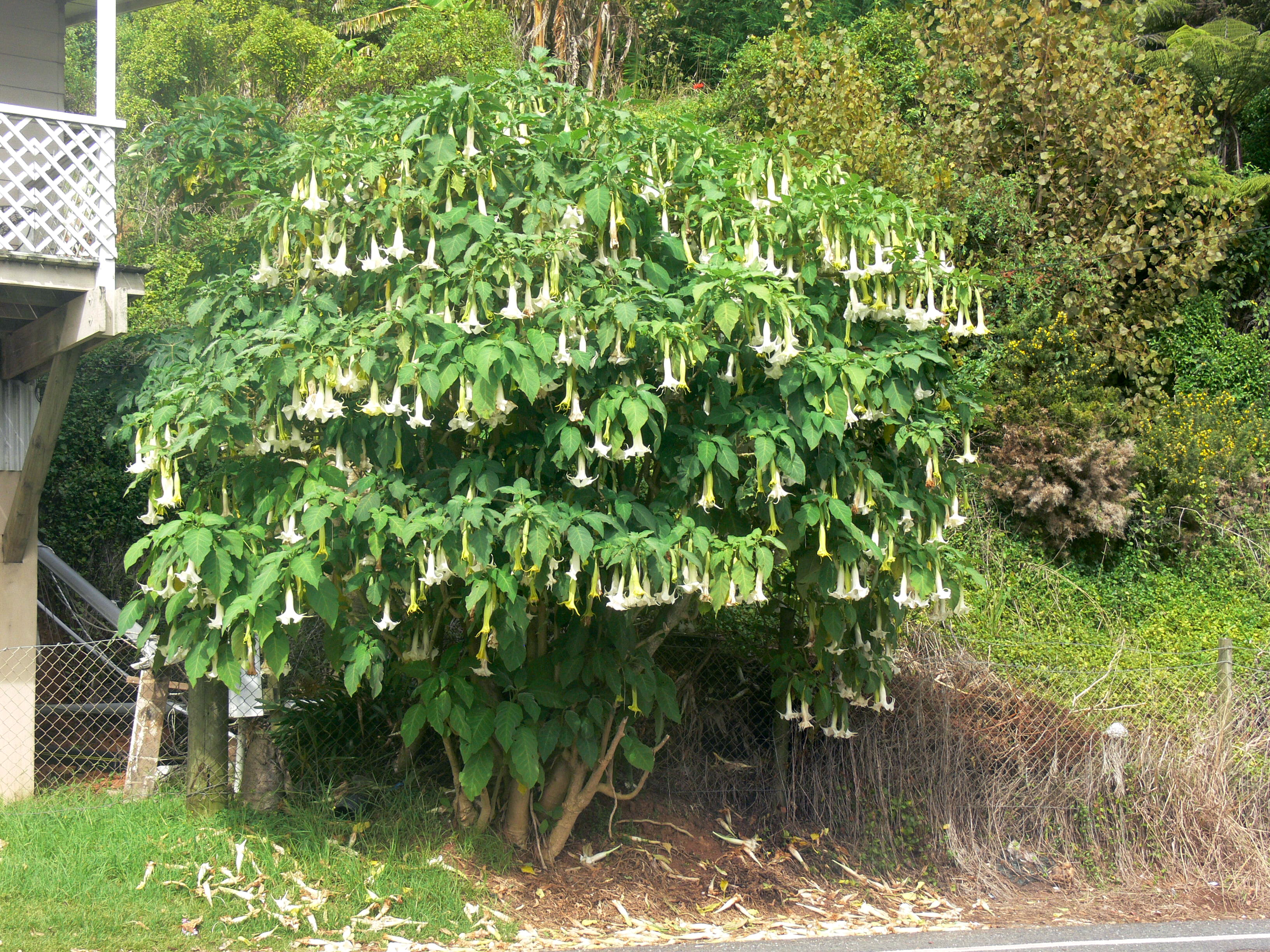
Brugmansia × candida, Mangonui, North Island, New Zealand

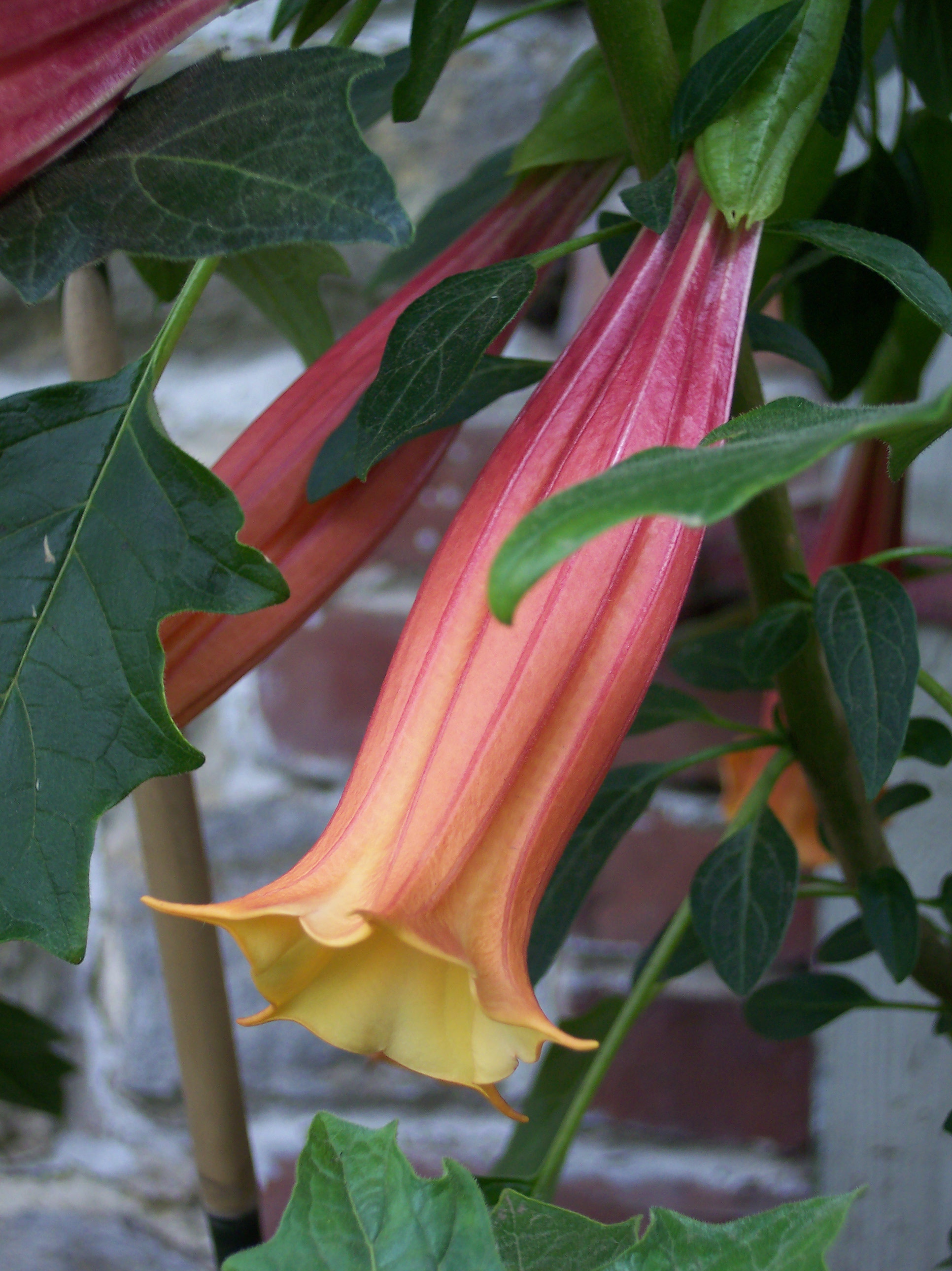
Brugmansia vulcanicola flower

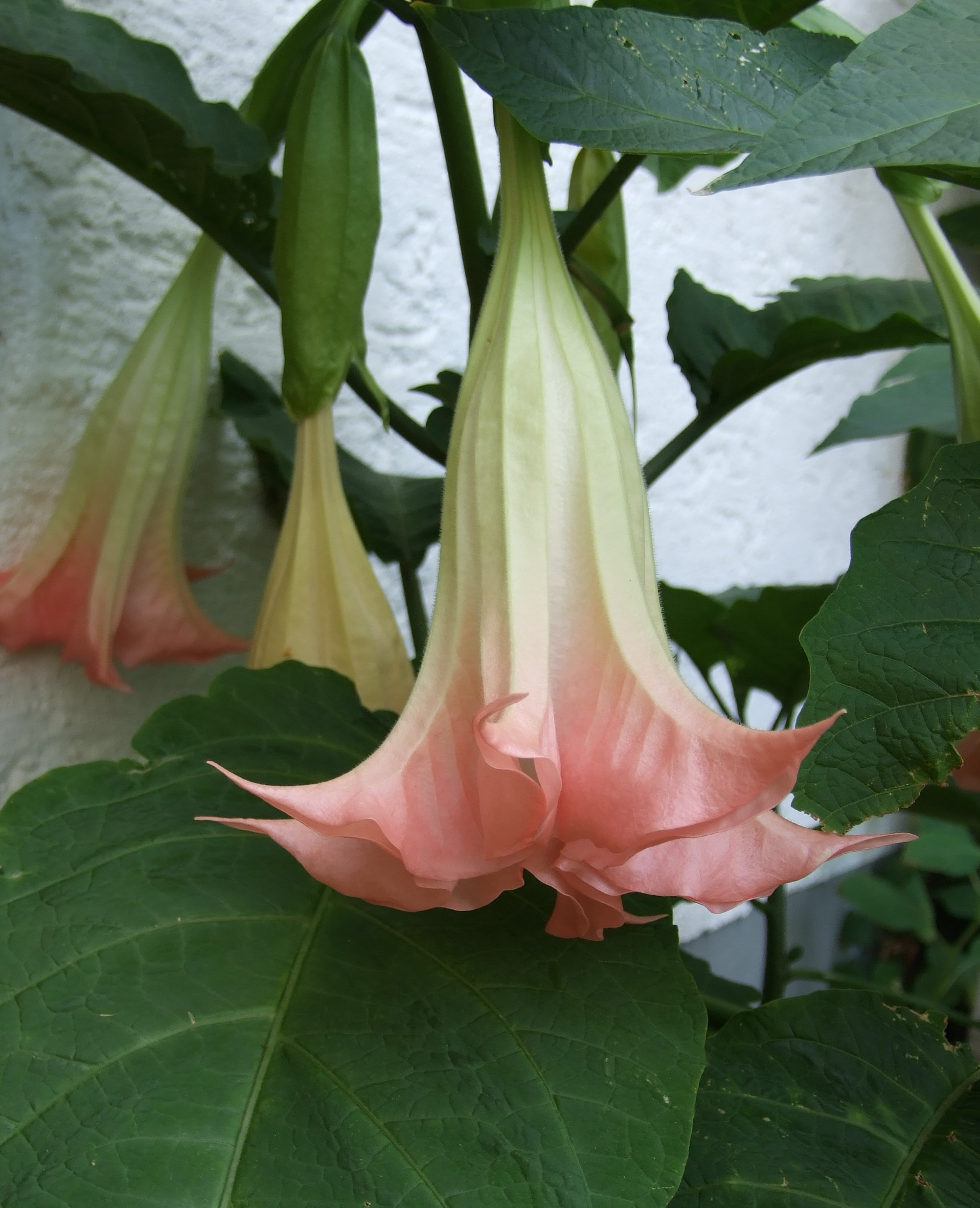
Brugmansia suaveolens flower

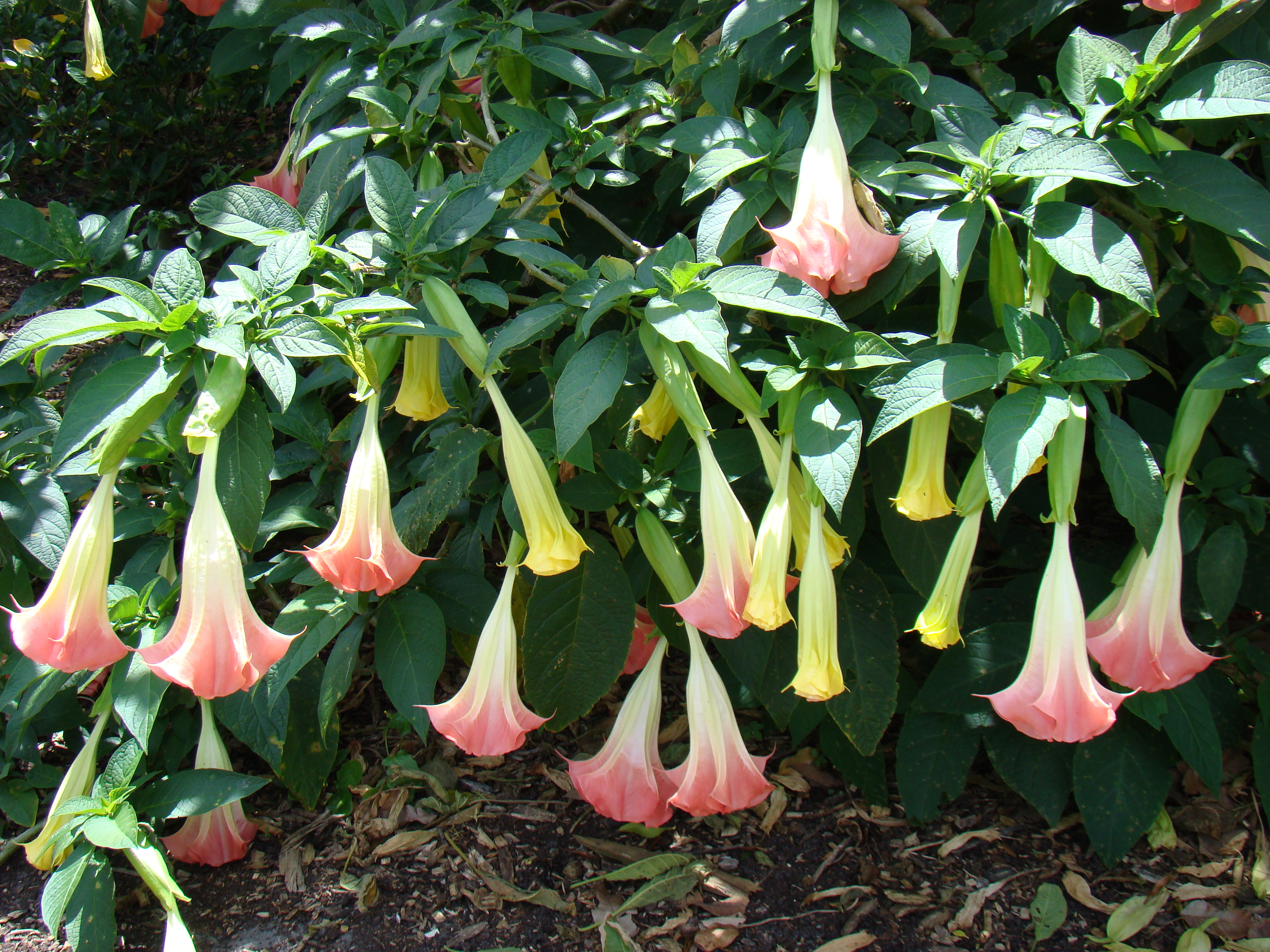
Mounts Botanical Garden, West Palm Beach, Florida

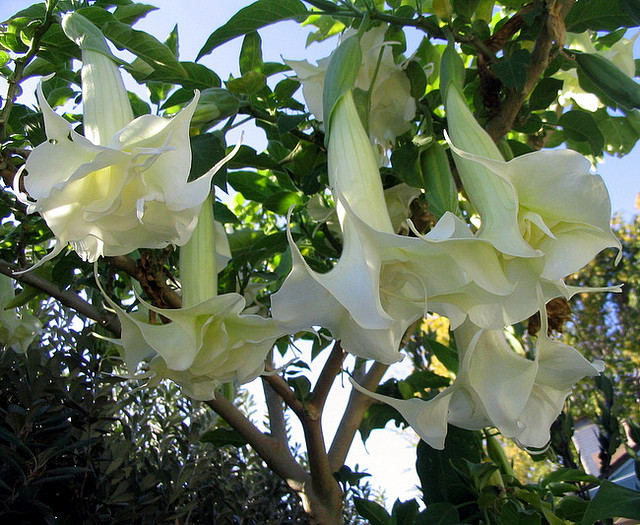
Brugmansia x candida, Berkeley, California, US

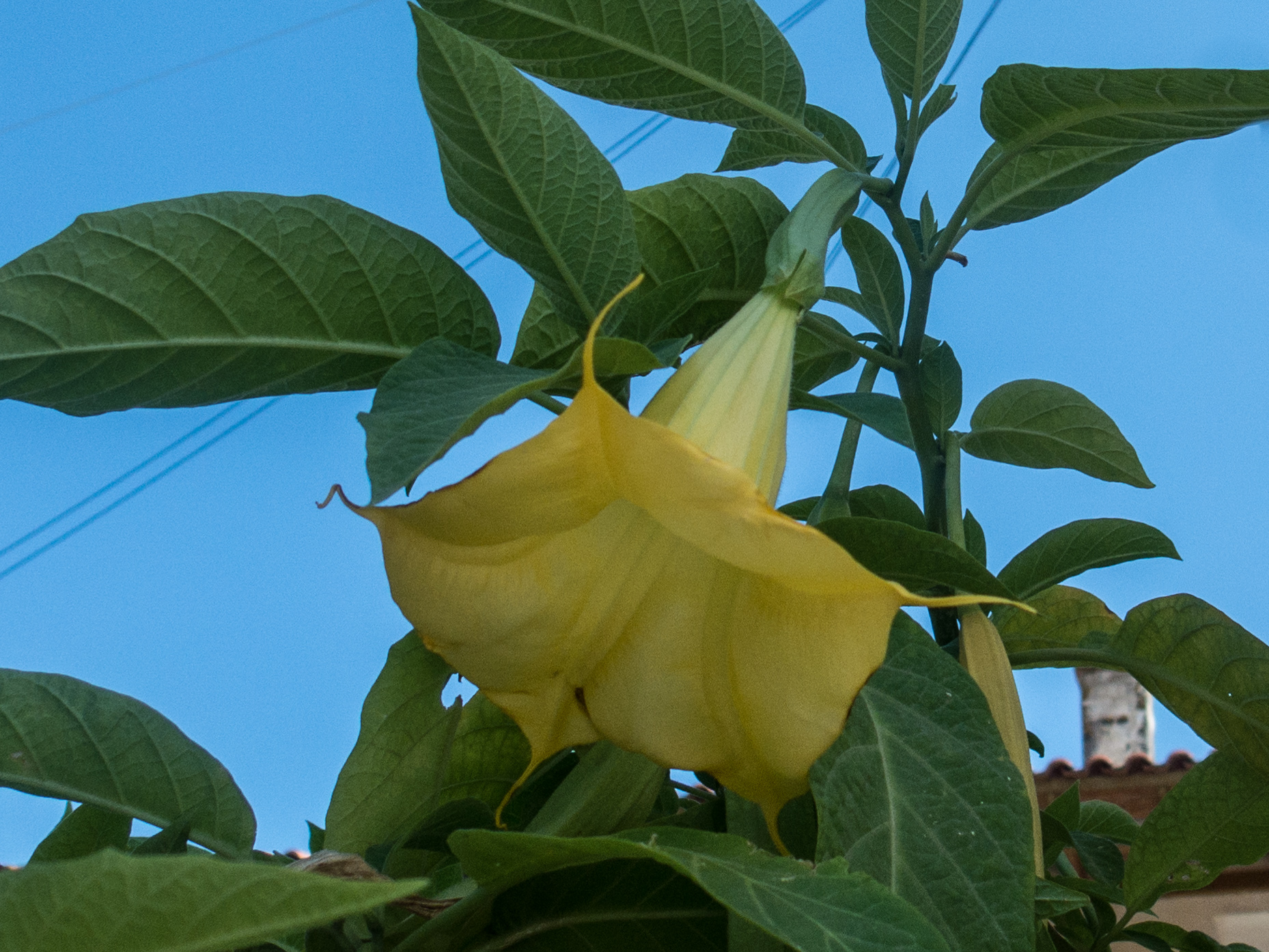
Brugmansia, Nafpaktos, Central Greece

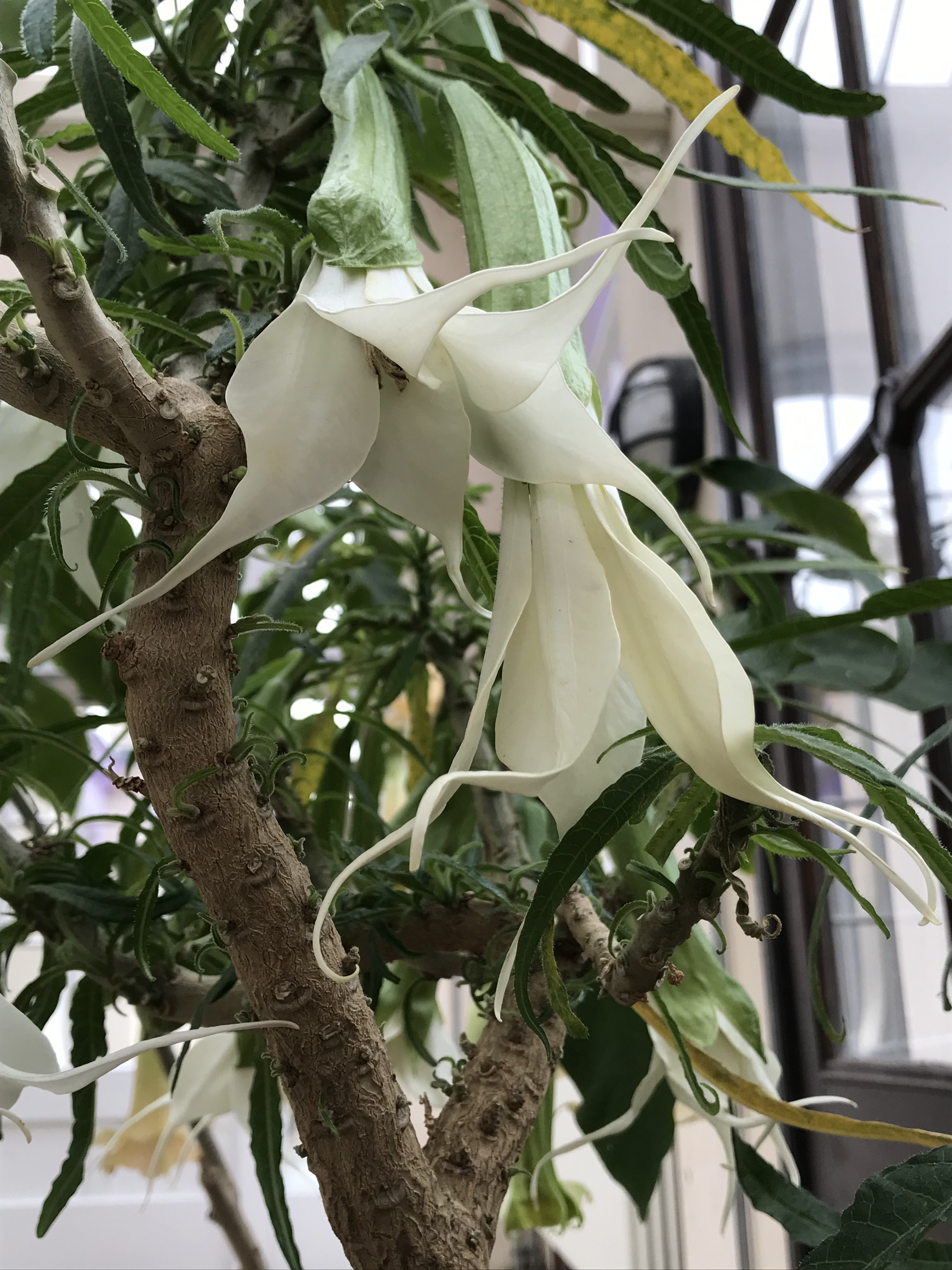
Brugmansia cultivar 'Culebra' (formerly Methysticodendron amesianum) Kew Gardens

== See also ==
- List of poisonous plants
