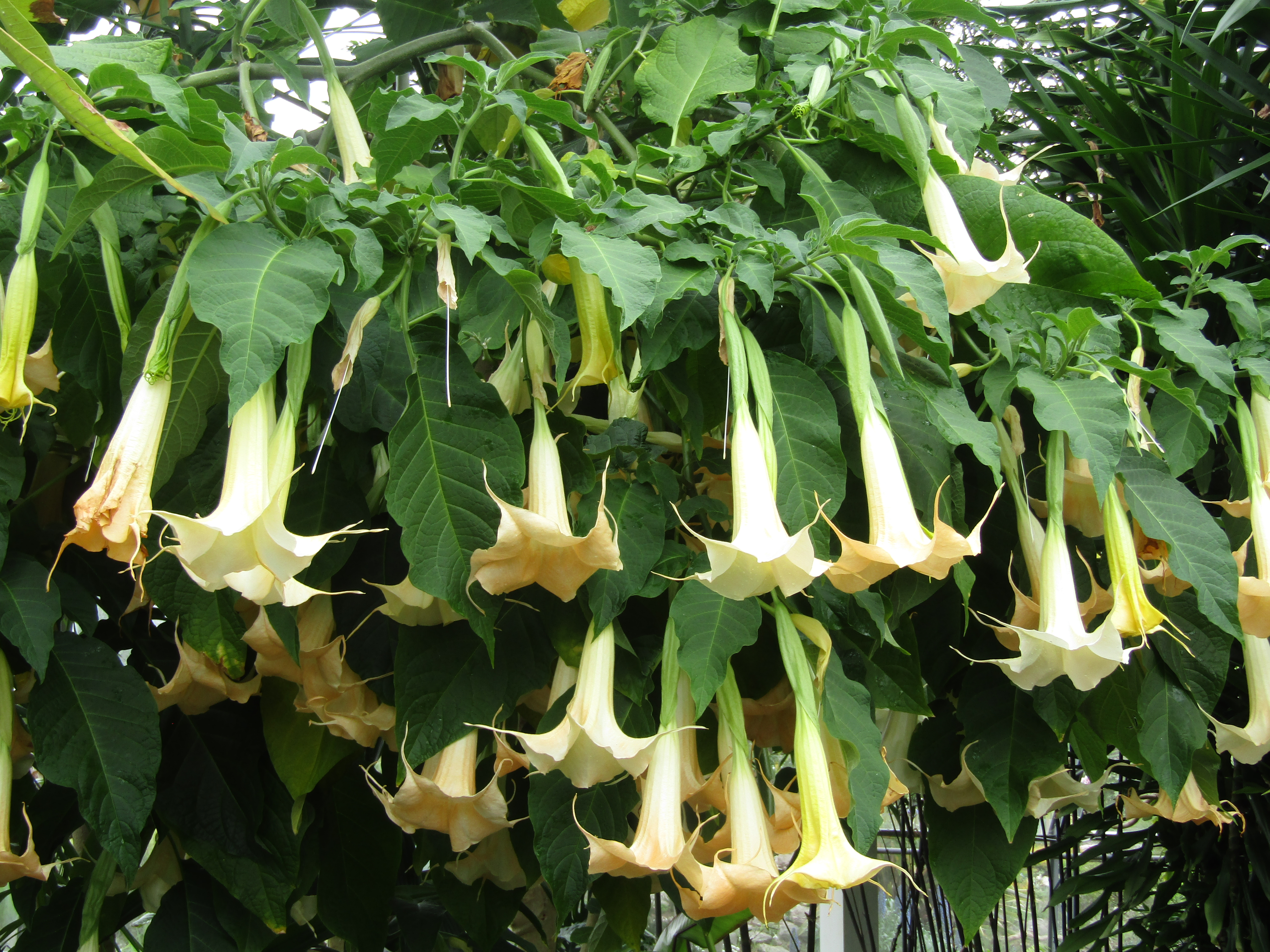

Conservation status
- Extinct in the Wild (IUCN 3.1)

Scientific classification
- Kingdom: Plantae
- Clade: Tracheophytes
- Clade: Angiosperms
- Clade: Eudicots
- Clade: Asterids
- Order: Solanales
- Family: Solanaceae
- Genus: Brugmansia
- Section: Brugmansia sect. Brugmansia
- Species: B. suaveolens

Binomial name
- Brugmansia suaveolens (Humb. & Bonpl. ex Willd.) Bercht. & J.Presl

Synonyms
- Datura suaveolens Datura gardneri Hook.

= Brugmansia suaveolens =

Species of plant

Brugmansia suaveolens, Brazil's white angel trumpet, also known as angel's tears and snowy angel's trumpet, is a species of flowering plant in the nightshade family Solanaceae, native to south eastern Brazil, but thought to be extinct in the wild. Like several other species of Brugmansia, it exists as an introduced species in areas outside its native range. It is a tender shrub or small tree with large semi-evergreen leaves and fragrant yellow or white trumpet-shaped flowers.

== Description ==
Brugmansia suaveolens is a semi-woody shrub or small tree, growing up to 3–5 m (10–16 ft) tall, often with a many-branched trunk. The leaves are oval, to 25 cm (10 in) long by 15 cm (6 in) wide, and even larger when grown in the shade.

The flowers, which tend to be white in colour, are sweetly scented at night and early morning, about 24–32 cm (9–13 in) long and shaped like trumpets. The corolla body is slightly recurved to 5 main points, but the very peaks in the true species are always curved outwards, never rolled back, and these peaks are short, only 1–2.5 cm (0.4–1.0 in) long. The flowers are usually white but may be yellow or pink and hang downward from fully pendulous up to nearly horizontal.

== Taxonomy ==
First discovered by Alexander von Humboldt and Aimé Bonpland, Brugmansia suaveolens was first formally described and published by Carl Ludwig Willdenow in 1809 as Datura suaveolens. In 1823, Friedrich von Berchtold and Jan Presl transferred these to Brugmansia suaveolens. Local common names include Maikoa, Huanduc, Maikiua, Tompeta del jucio, Tsuaak, Toe, Wahashupa, Peji, Bikut, Ohuetagi, Ain-vai, Baikua, Canachiari, and Ishauna. There are thousands of cultivated Brugmansia hybrids, and the majority have at least some B. suaveolens heritage. Some of the more popular cultivars include 'Dr. Seuss', 'Frosty Pink' and 'Charles Grimaldi'.

=== Etymology ===
The Latin specific epithet suaveolens means "with a sweet fragrance".

== Distribution and habitat ==
B. suaveolens was originally endemic to the coastal rainforests of south-east Brazil, where it grows below 1,000 m (3,300 ft) along river banks and forest edges with warm temperatures, high humidity, and heavy rainfall. As a result of human interaction with this species, it can now be found growing in residential areas throughout much of South America; and occasionally in Central America, Mexico, California, Greece, Africa and even in parts of Florida.

== Ecology ==
Fragrant in the evenings to attract pollinating moths, they hang half-closed during the day, but return to their peak again in the evenings. Brugmansia have two main stages to their life cycle. In the initial vegetative stage the young seedling grows straight up on usually a single stalk, until it reaches its first main fork at 80–150 cm (2.6–4.9 ft) high. It will not flower until after it has reached this fork, and then only on new growth above the fork. Cuttings taken from lower vegetative region must also grow to a similar height before flowering, but cuttings from the upper flowering region will often flower at a very low height.
One interesting example of plant/animal interaction involves the butterfly Placidula euryanassa, who uses Brugmansia suaveolens as one of its main larval foods. It has been shown that these can sequester the plant's tropane alkaloids and store them through the pupal stage on to the adult butterfly, where they are then used as a defense mechanism, making themselves less palatable to vertebrate predators.

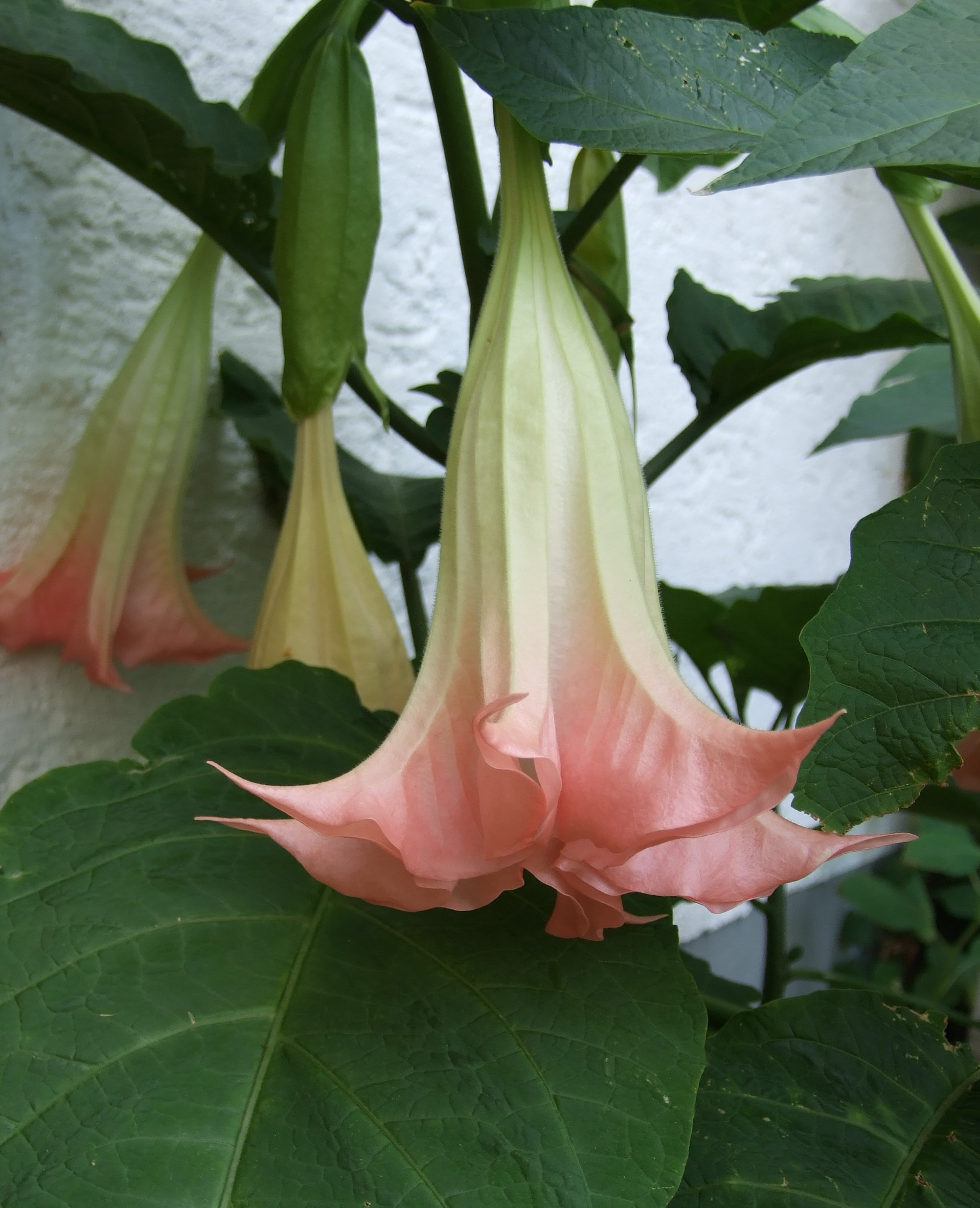
Pink flowered Brugmansia suaveolens

The species is invasive in New Caledonia.

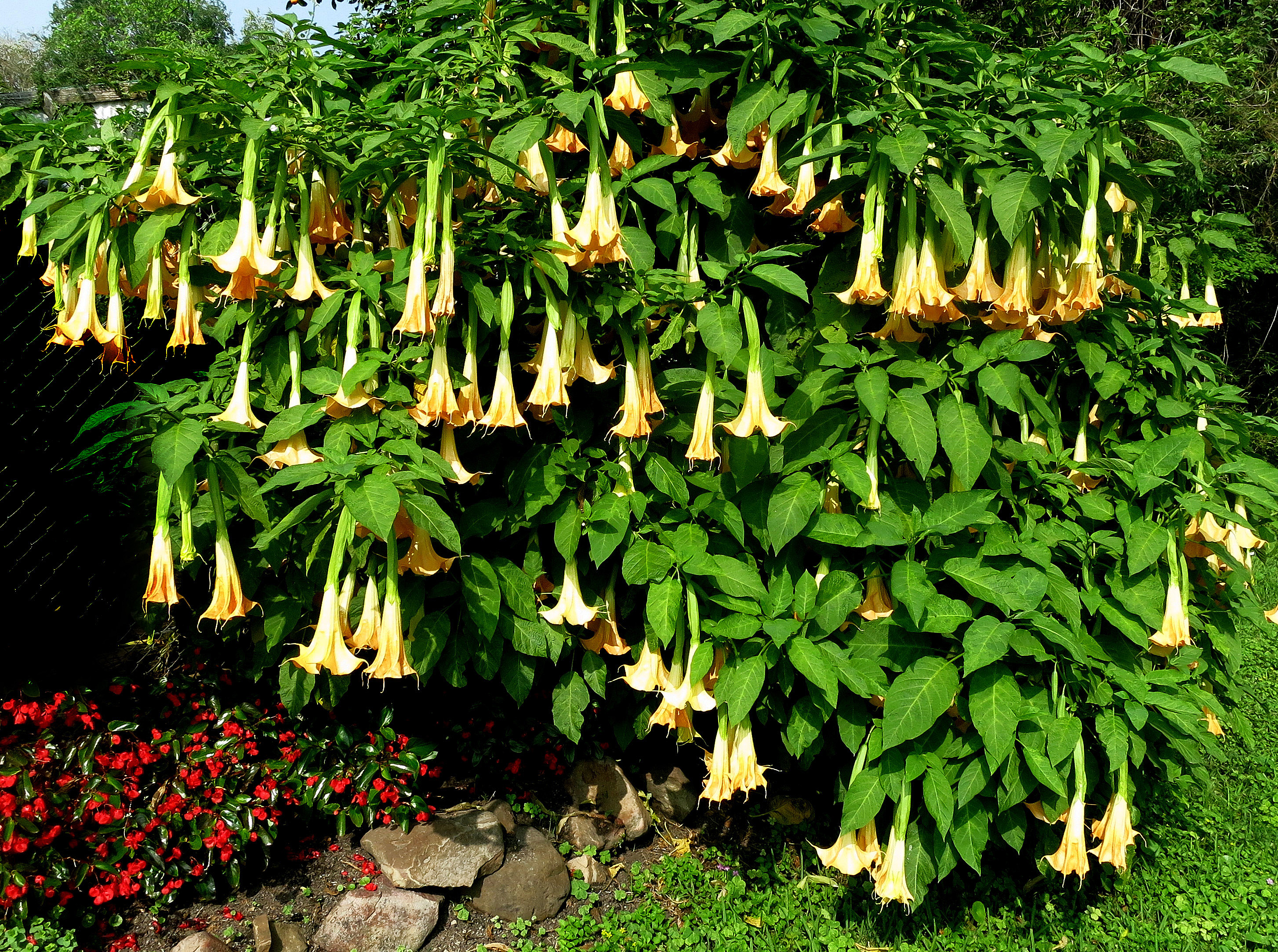
Brugmansia suaveolens on the Texas Gulf Coast

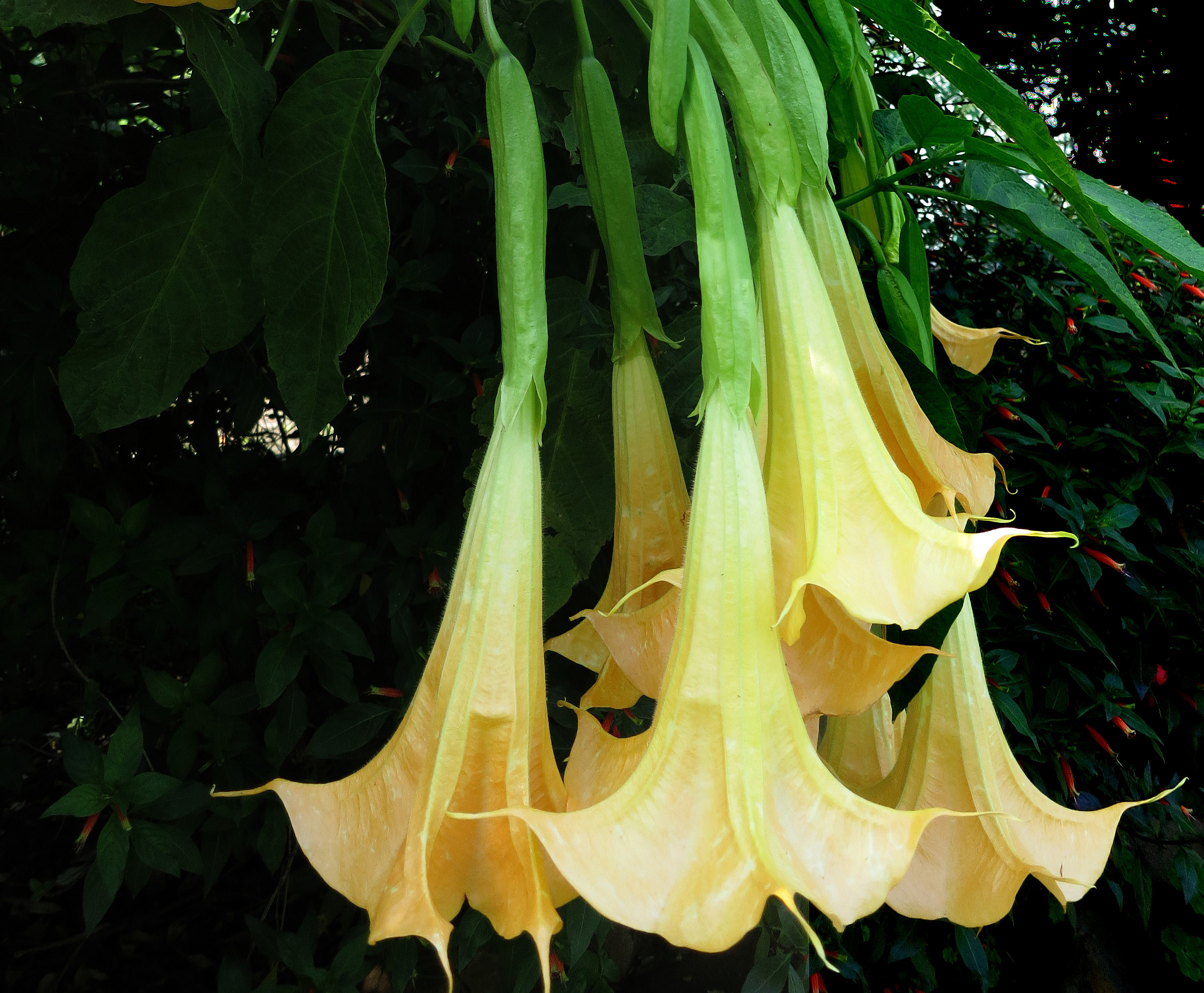
Brugmansia suaveolens

== Uses ==
Flower extracts of the plant have shown pain-killing (antinociceptive) activity in mice. This antinociceptive activity may be related in part to benzodiazepine receptors.
B. suaveolens is included in the Tasmanian Fire Service's list of low flammability plants, indicating that it is suitable for growing within a building protection zone. The flowers and the seeds are also traditionally used in Rio Grande do Sul, southern Brazil, mixed in water and ingested for its analgesic-like effect.

Many South American cultures have been noted to use Brugmansia suaveolens ritually. The Ingano and Siona in the Putumayo region both use it as an entheogen. It is also used by some Amazonian tribes as an admixture to increase the potency of Ayahuasca. In some South American countries, it is known to be occasionally added to ayahuasca brews by malevolent sorcerers or bad shamans who wish to take advantage of unsuspecting tourists. Genuine shamans believe one of the purposes for this is to "steal one's energy and/or power", of which they believe every person has a limited stockpile.

== Cultivation ==
Brugmansia are grown as ornamentals outdoors year-round in non-freezing climates around the world. They do not tolerate temperatures that fall significantly below 5 °C (41 °F) Like other large-leaved, fast-growing plants, they appreciate a little protection from the wind, as well as from the hottest afternoon sun. They like organically rich soil, frequent water, and heavy fertilizer when in full growth. Both woody and leafy tip cuttings are used to propagate Brugmansia, although thicker cuttings tolerate lower humidity. In northern climes they are often grown out in large containers and wintered over in non-freezing garages or basements. Alternatively they are suitable for a sunny conservatory. They may be trained as standards (with a single, straight trunk).

In cultivation in the UK this plant has gained the Royal Horticultural Society's Award of Garden Merit.

== Toxicity ==
Every part of Brugmansia suaveolens is poisonous, with the seeds and leaves being especially dangerous. As in other species of Brugmansia, B. suaveolens is rich in scopolamine (hyoscine), hyoscyamine, atropine, and several other tropane alkaloids. Effects of ingestion can include paralysis of smooth muscles, confusion, delusions, tachycardia, dry mouth, constipation, visual and auditory hallucinations, mydriasis, rapid onset cycloplegia, and death.
