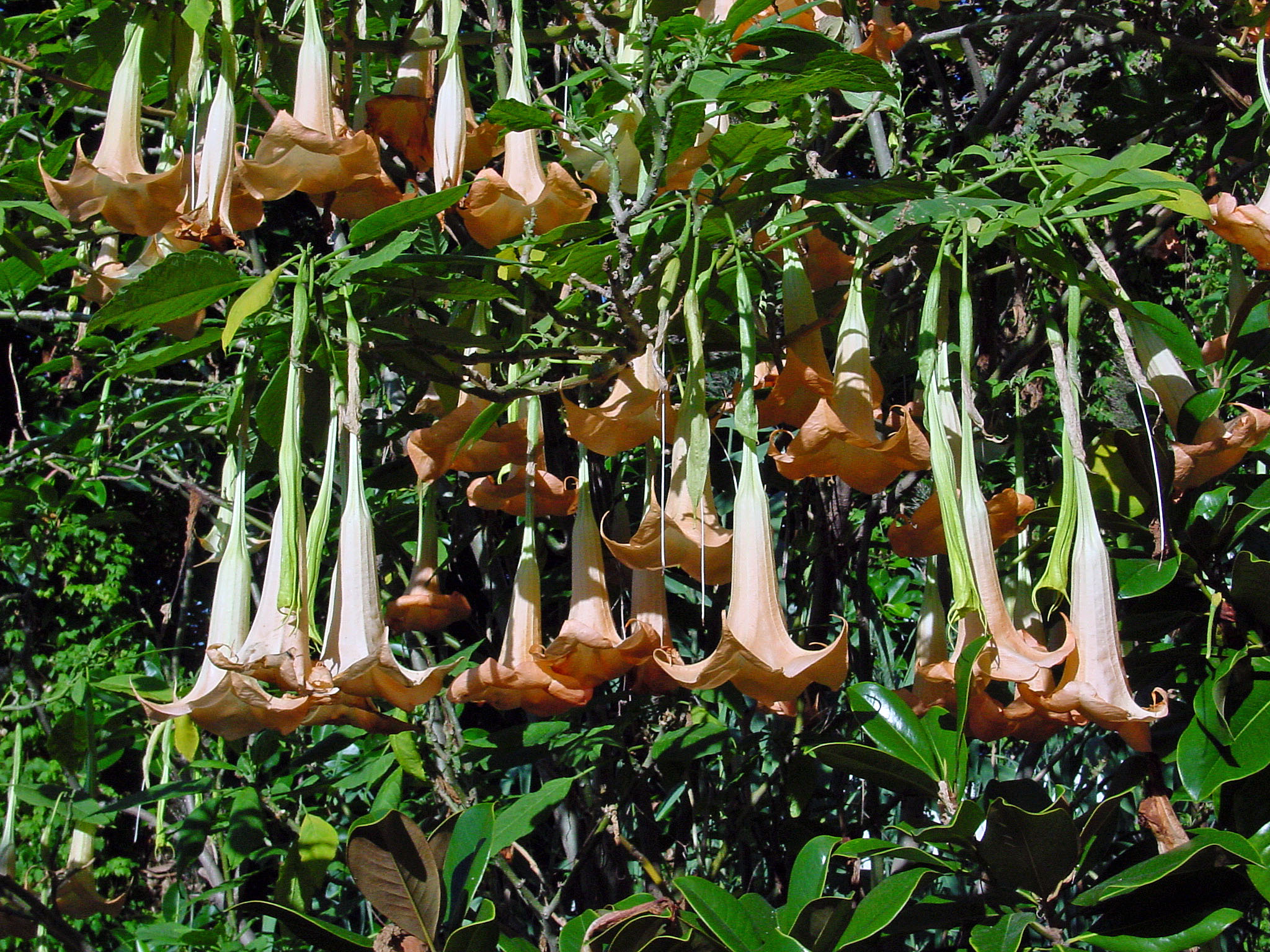

Conservation status
- Extinct in the Wild (IUCN 3.1)

Scientific classification
- Kingdom: Plantae
- Clade: Tracheophytes
- Clade: Angiosperms
- Clade: Eudicots
- Clade: Asterids
- Order: Solanales
- Family: Solanaceae
- Genus: Brugmansia
- Section: Brugmansia sect. Brugmansia
- Species: B. versicolor

Binomial name
- Brugmansia versicolor Lagerh.

= Brugmansia versicolor =

Species of flowering plant

Brugmansia versicolor is a species of plant in the family Solanaceae, commonly known as "angel's trumpets". They are endemic to Ecuador. Since March 2014, they have been listed as Extinct in the Wild by the IUCN.

== Description ==
Brugmansia versicolor is a bush or small tree reaching 3.0–4.9 m (10–16 ft) in height. It has an alternate insertion of elliptic/oblong leaves that are entire with smooth edges. One of the most prominent characteristics of B. versicolor is the presence of giant drooping flowers which hang upside down, which is where it gets its common name of Angel's Trumpet. The flowers are the largest of all Brugmansia at 300–510 mm (12–20 in) in length. They open first white, but then may age to turn peach, pink, apricot or remain white.

== Taxonomy ==
There are currently 7 distinct species of Brugmansia recognized, and they are very similar to their close relative Datura. For this reason the two genera were commonly mistaken for one another. "It was not until the discovery of the New World that Brugmansias appeared in the documented floras and later in gardens of the Old World. Initially Brugmansias were grouped with Daturas by the famous botanist Carl Linnaeus, who documented them in 1753 from a drawing and not from live plant material. In 1805, the South African taxonomist Christiaan Hendrik Persoon created a separate genus for Brugmansia, but it was not until 1973 that Tom E. Lockwood created a final division between the two genera.

== Distribution and habitat ==
Brugmansia species are native to the western part of South America, originating from Guayaquil Basin and south of the Gulf of Guayaquil in Ecuador. They are usually found growing in flat areas at elevations up to 790 m (2,600 ft), but are also frequently cultivated at low elevations throughout the tropics.

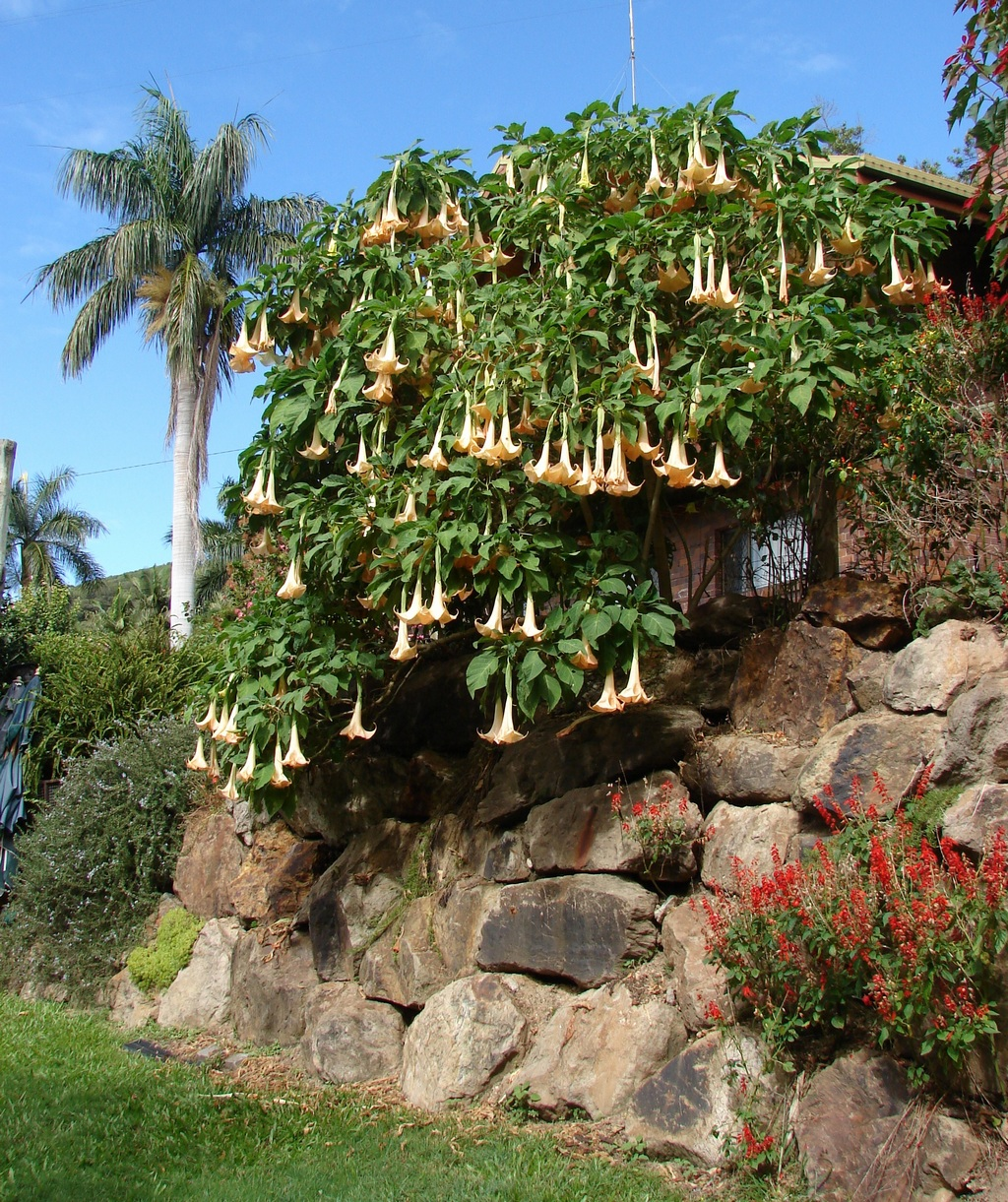

== Ecology ==
Brugmansia versicolor is a hermaphrodite that reproduces perennially. It has long, narrow, fusiform berries that are up to 21 cm (8.3 in) in length. Brugmansia reproduces by the production of seeds. The major pollinators are thought to be various species of insects, though this has yet to be proven.

== Culture ==
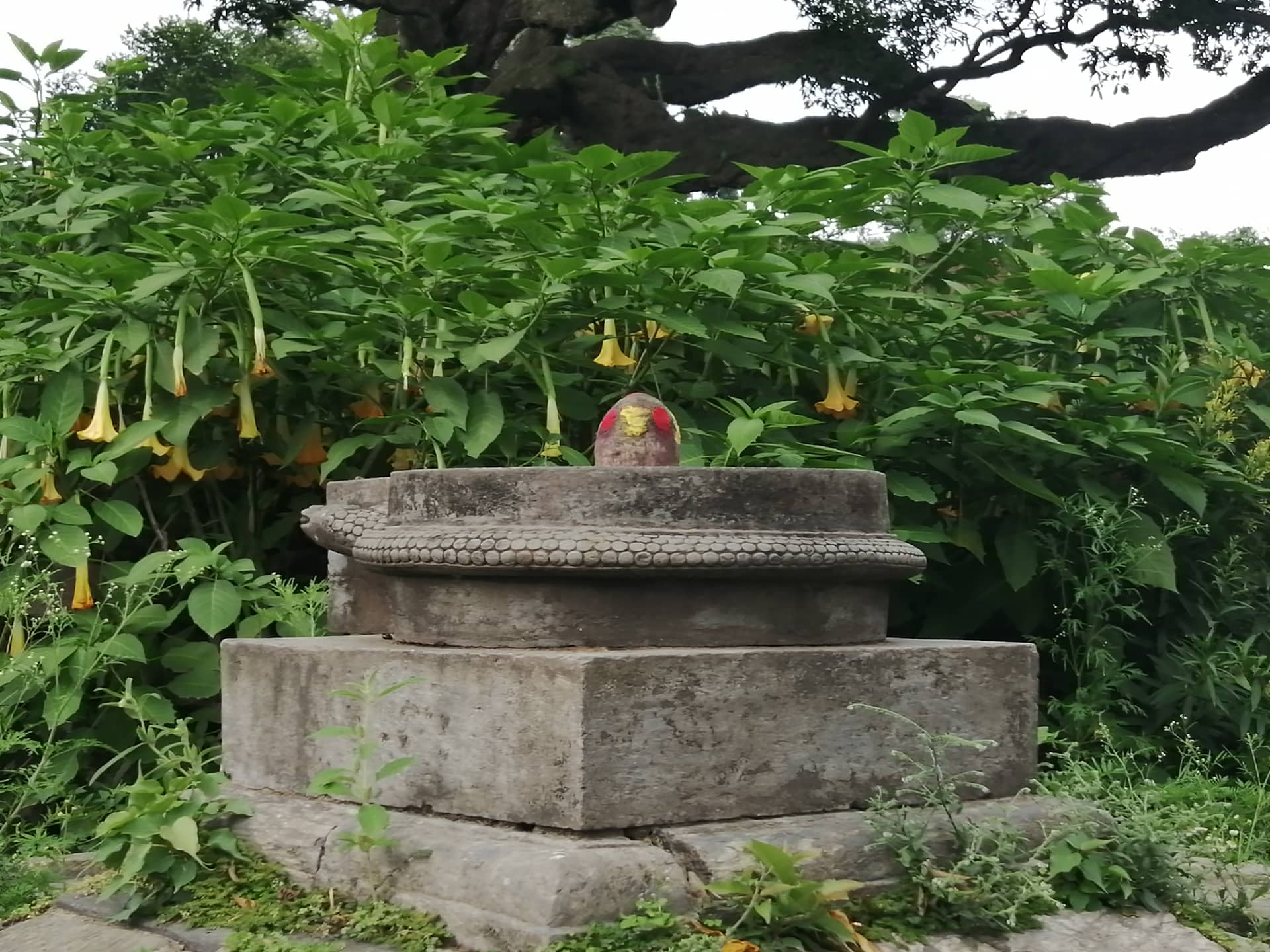
Brugmansia in Pashupatinath Temple

Brugmansia can withstand a wide range of temperatures including those that are slightly below freezing. A moderate frost will damage the plant in colder climates. Brugmansia will grow well if placed in a partially shaded or fully lit position. The plants tend to wilt in hot temperatures, but quickly recover in the evening as their flowers begin to open. They thrive in very fertile soils and average humidity. Clones can easily be made from stem cuttings, and Brugmansia grow readily from viable seeds, however the plant will not self pollinate.

== Toxicity ==
According to Dr. Russell, of North Carolina State University, Brugmansia versicolor is exceptionally poisonous if ingested in large quantities. Much like the distantly related Datura stramonium, it contains various tropane alkaloids that have toxic properties which affect the mind and body. Some of these alkaloids include atropine, scopolamine, and hyoscyamine. No matter if swallowed or inhaled, the flowers, leaves, and seeds of Brugmansia will most likely cause symptoms of hallucinations, dry mouth, muscle weakness, increased blood pressure, increased pulse, fever, dilated pupils, temporary insanity, and paralysis, convulsions, difficulty breathing, illusions, paralysis, coma, and loss of memory.

== Bibliography ==
- "Angel's trumpet, Brugmansia Versicolor - Shrubs - Solanaceae garden." Gardening.eu - home. 7 May 2009 .
- "Brugmansia Versicolor (PIER species info)." Hawaiian Ecosystems at Risk project (HEAR). 7 May 2009 .
- "Brugmansia Versicolor Solanaceae Angel's Tears." EEB Greenhouse Home Page. 7 May 2009 .
