= List of South American species extinct in the Holocene =

Map of South America

This is a list of South American species extinct in the Holocene that covers extinctions from the Holocene epoch, a geologic epoch that began about 11,650 years before present (about 9700 BCE) (Note: The source gives "11,700 calendar yr b2k (before CE 2000)". But "BP" means "before CE 1950". Therefore, the Holocene began 11,650 BP. Doing the math, that is c. 9700 BCE.) and continues to the present day.

The list includes extinctions in the Falklands and other islands near the continent but not the Galápagos Islands, which have their own list of extinct species. Extinct animals from the West Indies are covered in List of Antillian and Bermudan animals extinct in the Holocene. Extinctions from Easter Island, a territory of Chile in Polynesia, are covered in the List of Oceanian species extinct in the Holocene.

Many extinction dates are unknown due to a lack of relevant information.

== Mammals (class Mammalia) ==
=== Opossums (order Didelphimorphia) ===
==== Opossums (family Didelphidae) ====
Common name	Scientific name	Range	Comments
Red-bellied gracile opossum	Cryptonanus ignitus	Jujuy, Argentina	Last collected in 1962. The only known locality was destroyed by agriculture and urban development.

===== Possibly extinct =====
Common name	Scientific name	Range	Comments
One-striped opossum	Monodelphis unistriata	Southeastern Brazil and northeastern Argentina	Only collected twice, in 1821 in Brazil and 1899 in Argentina. The causes of decline are unknown, but possibly related to habitat loss through logging and agriculture.

=== Armadillos, pampatheres, and glyptodonts (order Cingulata) ===
==== Long-nosed armadillos (family Dasypodidae) ====
Scientific name	Range	Comments
Propraopus sulcatus	Eastern South America	Most recent remains at Toca do Serrote do Artur, Brazil dated to 6660-4880 BCE.

==== Chlamyphorid armadillos and glyptodonts (family Chlamyphoridae) ====
Scientific name	Range	Comments	Pictures
Doedicurus clavicaudatus	South American pampas	Most recent remains at Arroyo Seco, Argentina dated to 4765-4445 BCE.	
Eutatus seguini	Northern Argentina and Uruguay	Most recent remains at Arroyo Seco, Argentina dated to 6389-6060 BCE.	
Glyptodon clavipes	Eastern Brazil to the Argentinian pampa	Most recent remains at Toca do Serrote do Artur, Brazil dated to 6660-4880 BCE.	
Glyptodon reticulatus	Southern Brazil	Found in the late Pleistocene to early Holocene of Upper Ribeira Valley, southeastern São Paulo, Brazil but without direct datation.	
Glyptotherium cylindricum	Florida and Texas to northeastern Brazil	Found in the late Pleistocene to early Holocene of Serra do Ramalho, Brazil but without direct datation.	
Hoplophorus euphractus	Eastern Brazil	Most recent remains at Toca do Serrote do Artur, Brazil dated to 6660-4880 BCE.	
Neosclerocalyptus paskoensis	Southern South America	Most recent remains in Paraguay dated to 5120 BCE.	
Neuryurus sp.	Eastern Argentina and Uruguay	Most recent remains at Lobería, Argentina dated to c. 19050-8050 BCE.	
Panochthus tuberculatus	Argentina to southern Brazil	Found in the late Pleistocene to early Holocene of Luján, Argentina but without direct datation.	

==== Pachyarmatheres (family Pachyarmatheriidae) ====
Scientific name	Range	Comments	Pictures
Pachyarmatherium brasiliense	Eastern Brazil	Found in the late Pleistocene to early Holocene of Serra do Ramalho, Brazil but without direct datation.	

==== Pampatheres (family Pampatheriidae) ====
Scientific name	Range	Comments	Pictures
Holmesina majus	Minas Gerais and Ceará, Brazil	Found in the late Pleistocene to early Holocene of Serra do Ramalho, Brazil but without direct datation.	
Pampatherium sp.	Mexico, Central and South America	Found in the late Pleistocene to early Holocene of Serra do Ramalho, Brazil but without direct datation.	

=== Anteaters and sloths (order Pilosa) ===
==== Megalonychid ground sloths (family Megalonychidae) ====
Scientific name	Range	Comments	Pictures
Ahytherium aureum	Eastern Brazil	Found in the late Pleistocene to early Holocene of Upper Ribeira Valley, southeastern São Paulo, Brazil but without direct datation.	

==== Giant ground sloths (family Megatheriidae) ====
Common name	Scientific name	Range	Comments	Pictures
Panamerican ground sloth	Eremotherium laurillardi	Southern United States to Brazil	Most recent remains in the Miranda River basin, Brazil dated to 5477-4170 BCE.	
Giant ground sloth	Megatherium americanum	Temperate South America and the Andes	Most recent remains at Campo Laborde, Argentina were dated to 5270-4310 BCE and show signs of human hunting and processing.	

==== Mylodonts (family Mylodontidae) ====
Scientific name	Range	Comments	Pictures
Glossotherium robustum	South America	Most recent remains at El Cautivo, Ecuador dated to 6810-6650 BCE.	
Lestodon armatus	Southern Brazil	Found in the late Pleistocene to early Holocene of Upper Ribeira Valley, southeastern São Paulo, Brazil but without direct datation.	
Mylodon darwini	Pampas and Patagonia	Most recent remains at Cueva del Milodón, Chile dated to 10935-8804 BCE.	
Scelidodon chiliensis	Western South America	Most recent remains at Pampa de los Fósiles, Peru, dated to 7160-6760 BCE.	

==== Scelidotherid ground sloths (family Scelidotheriidae) ====
Scientific name	Range	Comments	Pictures
Catonyx cuvieri	Eastern South America	Most recent remains at Lagoa Santa, Brazil dated to 7830-7430 BCE.	
Scelidotherium leptocephalum	Southern South America	Most recent remains at Río Cuarto, Argentina dated to 5660-5540 BCE.	
Valgipes bucklandi	Intertropical region of Brazil	Most recent remains at Lagoa Santa, Brazil dated to 9110-9030 BCE.	

==== Nothrotheriid ground sloths (family Nothrotheriidae) ====
Scientific name	Range	Comments	Pictures
Nothrotherium maquinense	Eastern Brazil	Found in the late Pleistocene to early Holocene of Serra do Ramalho, Brazil but without direct datation.	

=== Elephant-like mammals (order Proboscidea) ===
==== Gomphotheres (family Gomphotheriidae) ====
Common name	Scientific name	Range	Comments	Pictures
Cuvier's gomphothere	Cuvieronius hyodon	Central America to northern and central Andes	Most recent remains at Quebrada Quereo, Chile dated to 7450-6850 BCE; however this date is not calibrated and the remains could be older.	
	Notiomastodon platensis	South America	Most recently dated at El Totumo, Colombia, to 4170-4050 BCE; however this date is uncalibrated and the remains are assigned to the Late Glacial. Other remains from Toro, Valle del Cauca are assigned to the Holocene but with no direct date. Calibrated remains at Itapipoca, Brazil were dated to 8209-5886 BCE, and at El Cautivo, Ecuador to 6810-6650 BCE.	

=== Rodents (order Rodentia) ===
==== Cavies (family Caviidae) ====
Common name	Scientific name	Range	Comments	Pictures
	Galea tixiensis	Río de la Plata basin to southern Bolivia	Most recent remains at the Tandilia mountains, Argentina dated to around 950 CE.	
Giant capybara	Neochoerus sp.	Southern United States to Brazil	Found in sites of Minas Gerais, Bahia, and Rondonia, Brazil that date from the Late Pleistocene to early Holocene, but without exact dating.	

==== Tuco-tucos (family Ctenomyidae) ====
Scientific name	Range	Comments
Ctenomys viarapaensis	Pampa de Achala, Argentina	Most recent remains at Quebrada del Real 1 dated to 5410 BCE - 1590 CE.

==== Neotropical spiny rats (family Echimyidae) ====
Scientific name	Range	Comments
Clyomys riograndensis	Rio Grande do Sul, Brazil	Most recent remains dated to 1750 BCE.
Dicolpomys fossor	Río de la Plata basin and southern Brazil	Most recent remains at Sambaquí de Puerto Landa, Argentina dated to 894-953 CE.
Proclinodontomys mordax	Rio Grande do Sul, Brazil	Most recent remains dated to 5250 BCE.

==== Rock rats, degus, and viscacha rats (family Octodontidae) ====
Scientific name	Range	Comments
Octomys sp.	Western Argentina	Most recent remains at Vaquerías Gruta 1, Argentina dated to 1150 BCE - 1570 CE. Related to the Mountain viscacha rat but different enough to be a new species.

==== Hamsters, voles, lemmings, muskrats, and New World rats and mice (family Cricetidae) ====
Common name	Scientific name	Range	Comments	Pictures
	Bibimys massoiai	Piauí, Brazil	Most recent remains at Toca do Serrote do Artur dated to 6943-3656 BCE.	
Candango mouse	Juscelinomys candango	Brasília, Brazil	Last collected in 1960. Presumed extinct when the area was urbanized.	
Vespucci's giant rat	Noronhomys vespuccii	Fernando de Noronha Island, Brazil	Only recorded alive by Amerigo Vespucci in 1503; otherwise known from subfossil remains.	

===== Possibly extinct =====
Common name	Scientific name	Range	Comments	Pictures
	Brucepattersonius talpinus	Lagoa Santa, Brazil	Known from Quaternary fossils.	
Fossorial giant rat	Gyldenstolpia fronto	Chaco Basin to southeastern Brazil	Known from the holotype collected in the Argentinian Chaco in 1896, and four Quaternary fossils from Lagoa Santa, Brazil.	
	Habrothrix clivigenis	Lagoa Santa, Brazil	Known from Quaternary fossils.	
	Juliomys anoblepas	Lagoa Santa, Brazil	Known from Quaternary fossils.	
Zuniga's dark rice rat	Melanomys zunigae	Lomas de Atocongo, near Lima, Peru	Last recorded in 1949. Declined due to habitat degradation caused by goat grazing and mining activity.	
	Oxymycterus cosmodius	Lagoa Santa, Brazil	Known from Quaternary fossils.	

=== Bats (order Chiroptera) ===
==== Leaf-nosed bats (family Phyllostomidae) ====
Common name	Scientific name	Range	Comments	Pictures
Giant vampire bat	Desmodus draculae	Eastern South America	Most recent remains in Centinela del Mar, Buenos Aires Province, Argentina dated to 1675-1755 AD.	

=== Carnivorans (order Carnivora) ===
==== Cats (family Felidae) ====
Common name	Scientific name	Range	Comments	Pictures
South American saber-toothed cat	Smilodon populator	Eastern South America	Most recent remains at Itapipoca, Brazil dated to 7129-6239 BCE.	

==== Dogs (family Canidae) ====
Common name	Scientific name	Range	Comments	Pictures
Dire wolf	Aenocyon dirus	North America and western South America	Most recent remains at Talara, Peru dated to 7320-6840 BCE; however this date is uncalibrated and the age of the remains could be older. Other late remains from Luján, Argentina were older than the most recent stratigraphical section dated to 9050-8050 BCE.	
Falkland Islands wolf	Dusicyon australis	Falkland Islands	Exterminated by sheep farmers in 1876.	
	Dusicyon avus	Argentina and Uruguay	Most recent remains in the Pampas dated to 1232–1397, and in southernmost Patagonia to 1454–1626.	
Fuegian dog	Lycalopex sp.	Tierra del Fuego and possibly southern Patagonia	Only domestic descendant of the culpeo, bred by the Selkʼnam people. Disappeared during the Selkʼnam genocide in the early 20th century.	
	Protocyon troglodytes	Middle South America to Yucatan	Most recent remains at Toca da Boa Vista, Brazil dated to 20,000-10,000 years ago.	

==== Bears (family Ursidae) ====
Scientific name	Range	Comments	Pictures
Arctotherium bonariense	Argentina	Recorded from the Middle Pleistocene to the Early Holocene.	
Arctotherium tarijense	Argentina, Uruguay, Bolivia, and Chile	Most recent remains at Cueva de los Chingues, Chile dated to 9310-9210 BCE. However this date was taken on a horse bone nearby and not calibrated, so the remains could be older.	
Arctotherium wingei	Northeastern South America	Most recent remains at Muaco, Venezuela dated to 7320-6840 BCE. However, this datation is uncalibrated and the remains could be older.	

==== Earless seals (family Phocidae) ====
Common name	Scientific name	Range	Comments	Pictures
Caribbean monk seal	Neomonachus tropicalis	Caribbean Sea, Bahamas, and Gulf of Mexico	Last recorded in Venezuela before 1700. The species was hunted for its skin, oil, and to remove competition for fishermen.	

=== Notoungulates (order Notoungulata) ===
==== Toxodonts (family Toxodontidae) ====
Scientific name	Range	Comments	Pictures
Toxodon platensis	South America	One tooth found at Abismo Ponta da Flecha, Brazil was dated to 4650-1450 BCE when testing its enamel, and 6050-3450 BCE when testing its dentine. Other remains at Itapipoca were dated to 7320-6099 BCE.	

=== Litopterns (order Litopterna) ===
==== Macrauchenids (family Macraucheniidae) ====
Scientific name	Range	Comments	Pictures
Macrauchenia patachonica	Southwestern South America	Most recent remains at Centinela del Mar, Argentina dated to 9381-9281 BCE.	
Xenorhinotherium bahiense	North and east South America	Most recent remains at Itapipoca, Brazil dated to 2267-1543 BCE.	

==== Proterotheriids (family Proterotheriidae) ====
Scientific name	Range	Comments	Pictures
Neolicaphrium recens	Northern Argentina, Uruguay, and southern Brazil	Most recent remains at the Dolores Formation, Uruguay dated to the Late Pleistocene-Early Holocene, but without exact datation.	

=== Odd-toed ungulates (order Perissodactyla) ===
==== Horses, asses, and zebras (family Equidae) ====
Scientific name	Range	Comments	Pictures
Equus neogeus	South America	Most recent remains at Toca do Serrote do Artur, Brazil dated to 6660-4880 BCE.	
Hippidion saldiasi	Eastern and southern South America (Note: Hippidion principale was included within H. saldiasi by Der Sarkissian et al. (2015).)	Most recent remains at Cueva del Medio, Chile dated to 10748-9456 BCE. In San Vicente de Tagua Tagua, Chile Hippidion was dated indirectly to c. 9430 BCE; however this date was uncalibrated and the remains could be older.	

=== Even-toed ungulates (order Artiodactyla) ===
==== Camels and llamas (family Camelidae) ====
Scientific name	Range	Comments	Pictures
Hemiauchenia paradoxa	Northern Río de la Plata Basin and central Brazil	Most recent remains in the pampas dated to 10850-9450 BCE.	
Palaeolama major	Northern and eastern South America	Most recent remains at Itapipoca, Brazil dated to 2281-1402 BCE.	

===== Locally extinct =====
Common name	Scientific name	Range	Comments	Pictures
Chilihueque	Population of Lama guanicoe	Central Chile	A third domestic South American camelid recorded by Europeans in the 16th and 17th centuries, bred by the Mapuche and different from llamas and alpacas. DNA analysis of remains from Mocha Island (where camelids were introduced by people) indicates that it was a population of Patagonian guanaco that was managed, or domesticated independently from the llama. It disappeared when indigenous communities switched to sheep and horse farming after colonization.	
Gracile llama	Population of Lama vicugna	Argentina and the Strait of Magellan	Formerly considered a separate species, Lama gracilis. Most recent remains in the pampas dated to 10850-9450 BCE.	

==== Peccaries (family Tayassuidae) ====
Common name	Scientific name	Range	Comments
	Catagonus bonaerensis	Buenos Aires Province, Argentina and Colonia Department, Uruguay	Remains dated from the late Pleistocene to earliest Holocene, but without exact datation.
Narrow-headed peccary	Catagonus stenocephalus	Western Argentina to southern Bolivia and central Brazil	Remains dated from the late Pleistocene to earliest Holocene, but without exact datation.

==== True deer (family Cervidae) ====
Scientific name	Range	Comments
Antifer ultra	Río de la Plata Basin to central Chile	Most recent remains in Chile dated to around 7950 BCE. However this datation was not calibrated and the remains could be older.
Morenelaphus brachyceros	Temperate South America	Most recently dated to 8050-5845 BCE; however this datation was not calibrated and the remains could be older. Other remains from southern Uruguay were dated, and calibrated, to 10010-9907 BCE.

== Birds (class Aves) ==
=== Landfowl (order Galliformes) ===
==== Chachalacas, guans, and curassows (family Cracidae) ====
===== Extinct in the wild =====
Common name	Scientific name	Range	Comments	Pictures
Alagoas curassow	Mitu mitu	Alagoas and Pernambuco, Brazil	Declined due to hunting and destruction of its habitat for sugarcane plantation, until the last known individual in the wild was killed near São Miguel dos Campos in either 1987 or 1988. All living individuals descend from three animals captured in 1977, and part of the current captive population is hybridized with the razor-billed curassow. The species was reintroduced to the wild in 2019.	

=== Waterfowl (order Anseriformes) ===
==== Ducks, geese, and swans (family Anatidae) ====
Common name	Scientific name	Range	Comments
Niceforo's pintail	Anas georgica niceforoi	Central Colombia	Last recorded in 1952. Possibly extinct due to hunting and habitat degradation.
Fighting shelduck	Neochen pugil	Minas Gerais, Brazil	Known from the late Pleistocene or early Holocene of Lagoa Santa, Brazil.

=== Grebes (order Podicipediformes) ===
==== Grebes (family Podicipedidae) ====
Common name	Scientific name	Range	Comments
Colombian grebe	Podiceps andinus	Bogotá wetlands, Colombia	Last recorded in 1977. Extinct due to wetland drainage, siltation, pesticide pollution, disruption caused by reed harvesting, hunting, and predation by introduced rainbow trout.

=== Nightjars (order Caprimulgiformes) ===
==== Typical nightjars (family Caprimulgidae) ====
===== Possibly extinct =====
Common name	Scientific name	Range	Comments
Cayenne nightjar	Setopagis maculosa	Tamanoir, French Guiana	Only known from the holotype collected in 1917.

=== Swifts, treeswifts, and hummingbirds (order Apodiformes) ===
==== Hummingbirds (family Trochillidae) ====
Common name	Scientific name	Range	Comments	Pictures
Bogotá sunangel	Heliantelus zusii	Northern Andes?	Only known from one skin purchased in Bogotá in 1909. It could have disappeared due to deforestation, though the original range is unknown.	
Alejandro Selkirk firecrown	Sephanoides fernandensis leyboldi	Alejandro Selkirk Island?, Juan Fernández Archipelago, Chile	Last recorded in 1908 (with doubts).	

===== Possibly extinct =====
Common name	Scientific name	Range	Comments	Pictures
Letitia's thorntail	Discosura letitiae	Bolivia	Only known from two males collected at an unknown locality in 1852.	
Turquoise-throated puffleg	Eriocnemis godini	Northern Ecuador	Only known from the holotype collected in 1850, with an unconfirmed sighting in 1976. The original habitat at the holotype's location is almost certainly destroyed.	

=== Pigeons and doves (order Columbiformes) ===
==== Pigeons and doves (family Columbidae) ====
===== Possibly extinct =====
Common name	Scientific name	Range	Comments	Pictures
Purple-winged ground dove	Paraclavis geoffroyi	Misiones to the southern Atlantic Forest	Once common through its range, the last collection of a wild individual for sure took place in Rio de Janeiro, Brazil in 1985. Another dove collected in 1991 could have been an escapee from captivity. It was last observed in Misiones, Argentina in 2017.	

=== Rails and cranes (order Gruiformes) ===
==== Rails (family Rallidae) ====
Common name	Scientific name	Range	Comments	Pictures
Red-throated wood-rail	Aramides gutturalis	Lima, Peru	Last recorded in 1843.	
Peruvian rail	Rallus semiplumbeus peruvianus	Peruvian highlands and possibly Ecuador	Only known from the holotype collected in 1886, which is now lost.	
	Rallus sp.	Fernando de Noronha Island, Brazil	A flightless species known from subfossil remains, presumably extinct due to predation by introduced mammals. Could have been a "land bird" mentioned by Vespucci in 1503, which was easily caught by hand.	

=== Shorebirds (order Charadriiformes) ===
==== Sandpipers (family Scolopacidae) ====
===== Possibly extinct =====
Common name	Scientific name	Range	Comments	Pictures
Eskimo curlew	Numenius borealis	Northwestern Canada and Alaska, and Southern Cone	Last confirmed record in South America in 1939, where it wintered. There was an unconfirmed sighting in Argentina in 1990. Likely extinct due to large scale hunting in North America, the conversion of the Great Plains to agriculture, and the extinction of the Rocky Mountain locust, once its prey. The South American pampas were converted to agriculture in the same manner afterward.	

=== Storks and allies (order Ciconiiformes) ===
==== Storks (family Ciconiidae) ====
Common name	Scientific name	Range	Comments	Pictures
Asphalt stork	Ciconia lydekkeri	Contiguous United States to Argentina	Known from the late Pleistocene or early Holocene of Lagoa Santa, Brazil.	

=== New World vultures (order Cathartiformes) ===
==== New World vultures and condors (family Cathartidae) ====
Common name	Scientific name	Range	Comments
	Pleistovultur nevesi	Matozinhos, Brazil	Known from a humerus dated around 10560-8040 BCE. Presumed extinct as a consequence of the disappearance of the megafauna.
Winge's vulture	Wingegyps cartellei	Bahia and Minas Gerais, Brazil	Known from the late Pleistocene or early Holocene of Lagoa Santa.

=== Owls (order Strigiformes) ===
==== True owls (family Strigidae) ====
===== Possibly extinct =====
Common name	Scientific name	Range	Comments
Pernambuco pygmy owl	Glaucidium mooreorum	Northeast coast of Brazil	Last recorded in 2001.

=== Parrots (order Psittaciformes) ===
==== Holotropical parrots (family Psittacidae) ====
===== Possibly extinct =====
Common name	Scientific name	Range	Comments	Pictures
Glaucous macaw	Anodorhynchus glaucus	Border area of Argentina, Brazil, Paraguay, and Uruguay	Last recorded in Mbaracayu, Paraguay in 2001. Declined due to clearance of gallery forests for agriculture and livestock grazing, and possibly also hunting and capture of animals for the exotic pet trade.	
Sinú parakeet	Pyrrhura subandina	Sinú Valley, Córdoba Department, Colombia	Last recorded in 1949. Declined due to habitat loss to agriculture and cattle grazing, hunting, trapping for the pet trade, and pollution with agrochemicals.	

===== Extinct in the wild =====
Common name	Scientific name	Range	Comments	Pictures
Spix's macaw	Cyanopsitta spixii	Sao Francisco River, Bahia, Brazil	Last recorded in the wild in 2000. Declined due to capture for the pet trade, and habitat loss caused by deforestation, livestock grazing, and the construction of the Sobradinho Dam.	

=== Perching birds (order Passeriformes) ===
==== Jacamars (family Galbulidae) ====
===== Possibly extinct =====
Common name	Scientific name	Range	Comments
Klages's jacamar	Brachygalba lugubris phaeonota	Tocantins, Brazil	Only known from the holotype collected in 1923.

==== Antpittas (family Grallariidae) ====
===== Possibly extinct =====
Common name	Scientific name	Range	Comments
Táchira antpitta	Grallaria chtonia	Southwestern Táchira, Venezuela	Last collected in 1955–1956. Declined due to extensive deforestation of its range for agricultural use.
Antioquia brown-banded antpitta	Grallaria milleri gilesi	Santa Helena, Antioquia, Colombia	Only known from the holotype, collected in 1878. The type locality has since been deforested for coffee cultivation and other agriculture.

==== Ovenbirds (family Furnariidae) ====
Common name	Scientific name	Range	Comments	Pictures
Cryptic treehunter	Cichlocolaptes mazarbarnetti	Alagoas and Pernambuco, Brazil	Last recorded in 2007. Extinct due to deforestation.	
Alagoas foliage-gleaner	Philydor novaesi	Alagoas and Pernambuco, Brazil	Last recorded in 2011. Extinct due to deforestation.	

===== Possibly extinct =====
Common name	Scientific name	Range	Comments
Northern stripe-crowned spinetail	Cranioleuca pyrrhophia rufipennis	Northern Bolivia	Last recorded in the 1950s.
Peruvian scale-throated earthcreeper	Upucerthia dumetaria peruana	Puno Region, Peru	Only known from two individuals collected in the early 1950s.

==== Antbirds (family Thamnophilidae) ====
===== Possibly extinct =====
Common name	Scientific name	Range
Rio de Janeiro antwren	Myrmotherula fluminensis	Rio de Janeiro, Brazil

== Reptiles (class Reptilia) ==
=== Turtles and tortoises (order Testudines) ===
==== Big-headed turtles (family Podocnemididae) ====
Scientific name	Range	Comments	Pictures
Peltocephalus maturin	Madeira River, Brazil	Only known from a lower jaw dated to 12385-7060 BCE, roughly coinciding with the time when the area was first reached by Paleo-Amerindians.	

== Amphibians (class Amphibia) ==
=== Toads and frogs (order Anura) ===
==== True toads (family Bufonidae) ====
Common name	Scientific name	Range	Comments
Maracay harlequin frog	Atelopus vogli	Güey River, Aragua, Venezuela	Last collected in 1957. Its habitat was destroyed by agriculture.

===== Possibly extinct =====
Common name	Scientific name	Range	Comments
Green and red venter harlequin toad	Atelopus pinangoi	Near Piñango, Mérida, Venezuela	Last recorded in 1997. Declined due to chytridiomycosis, habitat loss caused by logging and ranching, introduced trout, and climate change.
Scarlet harlequin toad	Atelopus sorianoi	Near Guaraque, Mérida, Venezuela	Last recorded in 1990. Possibly extinct due to chytridiomycosis caused by Batrachochytrium dendrobatidis, drought, road kills, and habitat loss caused by agriculture.

==== Tree frogs and allies (family Hylidae) ====
Common name	Scientific name	Range	Comments
Campo Grande tree frog	Boana cymbalum	São Paulo, Brazil	Last recorded in 1963. The only two known locations have been completely lost to urban development. If it survived in the nearby Serra da Paranapiacaba it may have been lost to pollution and chytridiomycosis during the 1970s or 1980s.
Spiny-knee leaf frog	Phrynomedusa fimbriata	São Paulo and Paraná states, Brazil	Last collected in the 1950s. Extinct due to air pollution and infection by Batrachochytrium dendrobatidis

==== Darwin's frogs (family Rhinodermatidae) ====
===== Possibly extinct =====
Common name	Scientific name	Range	Comments
Chile Darwin's frog	Rhinoderma rufum	Valparaíso and Biobío, Chile	Last recorded in 1981. The cause of decline is unknown but chytridiomycosis has been suggested.

==== Rain frogs (family Strabomantidae) ====
===== Possibly extinct =====
Common name	Scientific name	Range	Comments
Aragua robber frog	Pristimantis anotis	Henri Pittier National Park, Aragua, Venezuela	Last collected in 1974. The cause of decline is unknown, though chytridiomycosis is present in the area.

==== Water frogs (family Telmatobiidae) ====
===== Possibly extinct =====
Common name	Scientific name	Range	Comments
Mendelson's water frog	Telmatobius mendelsoni	Cusco and Ayacucho, Peru	Last recorded in 2007. Declined due to chytridiomycosis.

== Ray-finned fish (class Actinopterygii) ==
=== Catfishes (order Siluriformes) ===
==== Pencil catfishes (family Trichomycteridae) ====
===== Possibly extinct =====
Common name	Scientific name	Range	Comments	Pictures
Greasefish	Rhizosomichthys totae	Tota Lake, Colombia	Last collected in 1958. Possibly extinct due to exotic fish introductions (Eremophilus mutisii, Grundulus bogotensis, Carassius auratus, Oncorhynchus mykiss) and chemical pollution caused by agriculture.	

=== Toothcarps (order Cyprinodontiformes) ===
==== Pupfishes (family Cyprinodontidae) ====
===== Possibly extinct =====
Common name	Scientific name	Range	Comments	Pictures
Titicaca orestias	Orestias cuvieri	Lake Titicaca	The causes of decline are unknown.	

== Insects (class Insecta) ==
=== Beetles (order Coleoptera) ===
==== Predaceous diving beetles (family Dytiscidae) ====
Scientific name	Range	Comments	Pictures
Megadytes ducalis	Condeúba, Bahia, Brazil	Only known from individuals collected in the 19th century.	
Meridiorhantus orbignyi	Argentina and Brazil		

=== Bark lice, book lice, and parasitic lice (order Psocodea) ===
==== Bird body lice (family Menoponidae) ====
===== Possibly extinct =====
Scientific name	Range	Comments
Austromenopon confine	Americas	Parasite of the slender-billed curlew.

==== Bird chewing lice (family Philopteridae) ====
===== Possibly extinct =====
Scientific name	Range	Comments
Cummingsiella breviclypeata	Americas	Parasite of the slender-billed curlew.

== Arachnids (class Arachnida) ==
=== Order Mesostigmata ===
==== Family Halarachnidae ====
Common name	Scientific name	Range	Comments	Pictures
Caribbean monk seal nasal mite	Halarachne americana	Caribbean Sea	Extinct with its host.	

== Clitellates (class Clitellata) ==
=== Order Opisthopora ===
==== Family Glossoscolecidae ====
===== Possibly extinct =====
Scientific name	Range	Comments
Rhinodrilus fafner	Belo Horizonte, Minas Gerais, Brazil	Only known from the holotype described in 1918.

== Slugs and snails (class Gastropoda) ==
=== Order Littorinimorpha ===
==== Family Cochliopidae ====
Scientific name	Range	Comments
Littoridina gaudichaudii	Ecuador	

=== Order Stylommatophora ===
==== Family Odontostomidae ====
Scientific name	Range	Pictures
Tomigerus gibberulus	Brazil	
Tomigerus turbinatus	Brazil	

==== Family Strophocheilidae ====
Scientific name	Range
Megalobulimus cardosoi	Brazil

=== Unassigned order ===
==== Family Hemisinidae ====
===== Extinct in the wild =====
Scientific name	Range
Aylacostoma chloroticum	Paraná River

== Plants (kingdom Plantae) ==
=== Mosses (division Bryophyta) ===
==== Family Brachytheciaceae ====
Common name	Scientific name	Range	Comments
Santa Cruz bryophyte	Flabellidium spinosum	Santa Cruz mountains, Bolivia	Only known from the holotype collected in 1911. The type locality has since been logged and cultivated.

=== Ferns (class Polypodiopsida) ===
==== Wood ferns (family Dryopteridaceae) ====
===== Possibly extinct =====
Scientific name	Range	Comments
Ctenitis pallatangana	Pallatanga, Chimborazo Province, Ecuador	Only known from the holotype collected in the 19th century. Likely declined due to deforestation for agriculture.
Elaphoglossum gracilipes	Near Quito, Ecuador	Known only from the holotype collected before 1853.
Elaphoglossum polytrichum	Lloa Valley, southeast of Quito, Ecuador	Known only from the holotype collected in the 19th century. The locality is now completely deforested.

==== Polypodies and hard ferns (family Polypodiaceae) ====
===== Possibly extinct =====
Scientific name	Range	Comments
Melpomene brevipes	Tungurahua Volcano, Ecuador	Known only from the holotype collected in the 19th century.

=== Flowering plants (clade Angiospermae) ===
==== Moschatels (family Adoxaceae) ====
===== Possibly extinct =====
Scientific name	Range	Comments
Viburnum divaricatum	El Oro Province, Ecuador	Only known from the holotype collected before 1844.

==== Dogbanes (family Apocynaceae) ====
===== Possibly extinct =====
Scientific name	Range	Comments
Matelea ecuadorensis	Near Quito, Ecuador	Only known from the holotype collected in the 19th century. Likely extinct due to habitat destruction.
Prestonia schumanniana	Balao, Guayas Province, Ecuador	Only known from the holotype collected in 1892. Possibly extinct due to habitat destruction.

==== Arums (family Araceae) ====
===== Possibly extinct =====
Scientific name	Range	Comments
Philodendron balaoanum	Balao, Guayas Province, Ecuador	Only known from the holotype collected in 1891.

==== Sunflowers (family Asteraceae) ====
===== Possibly extinct =====
Scientific name	Range	Comments	Pictures
Aetheolaena hypoleuca	Pichincha Province, Ecuador	Only known from the holotype collected in an unknown location in 1851. Likely extinct due to deforestation.	
Aetheolaena ledifolia	Pichincha Province, Ecuador	Only known from the holotype collected by Alexander von Humboldt in an unknown location during the early 19th century. Likely extinct due to habitat destruction.	
Aetheolaena pichinchensis	Pichincha Volcano, Ecuador	Only known from the holotype collected in 1864. Likely extinct due to habitat destruction.	
Aster quitensis	Near Quito, Ecuador	Only known from the holotype collected in the 1820s. Likely extinct due to habitat destruction.	
Baccharis fusca	Near Quito, Ecuador	Last collected in the 1850s. Likely extinct due to habitat destruction.	
Egletes humifusa	Guayas Province, Ecuador	Only known from the holotype collected in 1836. Possibly extinct due to deforestation.	
Elaphandra retroflexa	Guayaquil, Ecuador	Last collected in 1921. Possibly extinct due to deforestation.	
Mikania iserniana	Guayaquil, Ecuador	Only known from the holotype collected in 1864. Possibly extinct due to coastal agriculture expansion and urban development.	
Mikania seemannii	Loja, Ecuador	Only known from the holotype collected between 1845 and 1852. Possibly extinct due to habitat destruction.	

===== Extinct in the wild =====
Scientific name	Range	Comments	Pictures
Senecio leucopeplus	The last two individuals in the wild died by 2007.	Tornquist Partido, Buenos Aires, Argentina	

==== Forget-me-nots (family Boraginaceae) ====
===== Possibly extinct =====
Scientific name	Range	Comments
Amsinckia marginata	Near Quito, Ecuador	Only known from the holotype collected in the early 20th century.
Tournefortia obtusifolia	Puna Island lowlands, Ecuador; a captive plant of unknown origin existed in Colombia	Last recorded in the 19th century.

==== Bromeliads (family Bromeliaceae) ====
===== Possibly extinct =====
Scientific name	Range	Comments
Aechmea cymosopaniculata	Near Tovar, Aragua, Venezuela	Only known from the holotype collected in 1856.
Guzmania lepidota	Pululahua volcano, Ecuador	Only known from the holotype collected in 1876. The area has since been completely deforested for agriculture and charcoal production.
Guzmania poortmanii	Between Cangonama and Chinchanga, Loja, Ecuador	Only known from the holotype collected in 1889.
Guzmania striata	Pastaza River, Ecuador	Only known from the holotype collected in 1956.

==== Cacti (family Cactaceae) ====
===== Possibly extinct in the wild =====
Scientific name	Range	Comments	Pictures
Cereus estevesii	Minas Gerais, Brazil	Last recorded in the wild in 2002, when nearly its whole habitat was cleared for the cultivation of biofuels.	
Discocactus subterraneo-proliferans	Britânia, Goiás, Brazil	Last recorded in the wild in 1984. Likely extinct due to clearing for agriculture and cattle ranching.	

==== Bellflowers (family Campanulaceae) ====
===== Possibly extinct =====
Scientific name	Range	Comments
Centropogon brachysiphoniatus	Pichincha Volcano, Ecuador	Last collected in 1935. The original forest is fragmented, often burned by tourists, and threatened by the expansion of introduced Pinus.
Siphocampylus loxensis	Near Loja, Ecuador	Only known from the holotype collected by Alexander von Humboldt in the early 19th century.

==== Coco-plums (family Chrysobalanaceae) ====
===== Possibly extinct =====
Scientific name	Range	Comments
Licania caldasiana	Colombia	Only known from the holotype collected by José Celestino Mutis in an unknown location, during the 18th century.

==== Legumes (family Fabaceae) ====
===== Possibly extinct =====
Scientific name	Range	Comments
Clitoria andrei	Between Guayaquil and Santa Rosa, Ecuador	Only known from the holotype collected in 1876. Possibly extinct due to deforestation.

==== Magnolias (family Magnoliaceae) ====
===== Possibly extinct in the wild =====
Common name	Scientific name	Range	Comments
Hojarasco de Santa Rosa	Magnolia wolfii	Santa Rosa de Cabal, Colombia	Last recorded in the wild in 2006. Declined due to deforestation caused by coffee cultivation.

==== Melastomes (family Melastomataceae) ====
===== Possibly extinct =====
Scientific name	Range	Comments
Miconia longisetosa	Pichincha Volcano, Ecuador	Only known from the holotype collected in 1886.
Miconia scabra	Chimborazo Volcano, Ecuador	Only known from the holotype collected in 1876.

==== Lemonwoods (family Monimiaceae) ====
===== Possibly extinct =====
Scientific name	Range	Comments
Mollinedia myriantha	Macaé de Cima Environmental Protection Area, Nova Friburgo, Rio de Janeiro, Brazil	After being known for a long time from the 1892 holotype alone, a single tree was rediscovered in 2015, but was found dead between 2018 and 2019. Probably extinct due to habitat fragmentation and degradation caused by construction and other human activities.

==== Myrtles (family Myrtaceae) ====
Common name	Scientific name	Range	Comments
Rio de Janeiro myrtle	Campomanesia lundiana	Rio de Janeiro, Brazil	Only known from the holotype collected in 1825.
	Myrcia neocambessedeana	Rio de Janeiro, Brazil	Last collected in the early 19th century.

===== Possibly extinct =====
Common name	Scientific name	Range	Comments
Arrayán	Eugenia albida	Loja Province, Ecuador	Only known from the holotype collected in the early 19th century; the precise location is unknown.
	Eugenia guayaquilensis	Guayas Province, Ecuador	Last collected before 1823. Possibly declined due to deforestation.

==== Peppers (family Piperaceae) ====
===== Possibly extinct =====
Scientific name	Range	Comments
Peperomia dauleana	Daule River, Guayas Province, Ecuador	Only known from holotypes collected in the 19th century. Likely extinct due to total deforestation of the only known localities.
Peperomia petraea	Huambi River, Pichincha Province, Ecuador	Only known from holotypes collected in the 19th century. Likely extinct due to total deforestation of the only known localities.
Piper molliusculum	Puente de Chimbo, Guayas Province, Ecuador	Only known from the holotype. Possibly extinct due to deforestation.

==== Milkworts (family Polygalaceae) ====
===== Possibly extinct =====
Scientific name	Range	Comments
Polygala quitensis	Ibarra, Ecuador	Only known from the holotype collected before 1854. Possibly extinct due to urban development.

==== True grasses (family Poaceae) ====
Scientific name	Range	Comments	Pictures
Festuca masatierrae	Robinson Crusoe Island, Juan Fernández Archipelago, Chile	Last collected around 1861.	

===== Possibly extinct =====
Scientific name	Range	Comments
Andropogon benthamianus	Near Quito, Ecuador	Only known from the holotype collected between 1841 and 1843. Possibly extinct due to urban development.

==== Riverweeds (family Podostemaceae) ====
===== Possibly extinct =====
Scientific name	Range	Comments
Devillea flagelliformis	Tocantins River, Brazil	Only known from the holotype collected in the 1840s. The species grew attached to rocks in river-rapids, which were flooded by the Lajeado hydroelectric dam.

==== Coffee and relatives (family Rubiaceae) ====
===== Possibly extinct =====
Scientific name	Range	Comments	Pictures
Manettia canescens	Cotaló, Ecuador	Only known from the holotype collected in the 19th century. The area is nearly completely deforested today.	
Manettia holwayi	Huigra, Ecuador	Only known from the holotype collected in 1920. The area is now highly degraded.	

==== Willows (family Salicaceae) ====
Scientific name	Range
Casearia quinduensis	Tolima and possibly Quindio, Colombia
Ryania speciosa var. mutisii	unclear; either Tolima or Cundinamarca, Colombia

==== Sandalwoods (family Santalaceae) ====
Common name	Scientific name	Range	Comments	Pictures
Chile sandalwood	Santalum fernandezianum	Juan Fernández Archipelago, Chile	Last recorded in 1908. It was cut to extinction for its aromatic wood.	

==== Sapodillas (family Sapotaceae) ====
Scientific name	Range	Comments
Pradosia glaziovii	Rio de Janeiro, Brazil	Only known from two individuals.
Pradosia mutisii	Colombia	Last collected in the early 20th century, in an unknown location.

==== Nightshades (family Solanaceae) ====
===== Possibly extinct =====
Scientific name	Range	Comments
Solanum semicoalitum	Near Gualaceo, Ecuador	Only known from the holotype collected in 1864. The area has been "massively disturbed" since then.

===== Extinct in the wild =====
Common name	Scientific name	Range	Comments	Pictures
Huanduj	Brugmansia arborea	Andean region from northern Chile to Ecuador; introduced to Nariño, Colombia	No species was ever observed in the wild; their existence in domestic state only was first noted by Hipólito Ruiz and José Antonio Pavón in the 18th century. The original ranges were reconstructed on the basis of areas with higher intraspecific variability and levels of fruit set, compared to others with low variability and low or absent fruit set in clones taken outside their native range. It is believed that the consumption of the fruit by extinct megafauna was needed to induce seed dispersal and germination, because its high content in tropane alkaloids is not tolerated by livestock, deer, or camelids, and attempts to germinate seeds artificially have been unsuccessful. Following the extinction of the megafauna, the seven species survived because they were propagated clonally by indigenous peoples who used them as medicinal plants and entheogens, and are now threatened by social condemnation and abandonment of psychotropics in more recent times. B. vulcanicola is also threatened by hybridization with the more widespread B. sanguinea.	
Huanduj	Brugmansia aurea	South-central Ecuador to northeastern Colombia		
Huanduj	Brugmansia insignis	Eastern Andes foothills of western Amazonia from Colombia to Bolivia; introduced to Meta, Colombia, Santo Domingo, Ecuador, and the Pacific coastal lowlands of Colombia and Ecuador		
Huanduj	Brugmansia sanguinea	Tropical Andes from northern Chile to central Colombia		
	Brugmansia suaveolens	Brazilian Atlantic Forest from Rio Grande do Sul to southern Bahia		
Huanduj	Brugmansia versicolor	Lowland Pacific slopes of the Andes from the Guayas Basin and along the Gulf of Guayaquil, Ecuador		
Guamuco	Brugmansia vulcanicola	Possibly the eastern and central Andes from south-central Ecuador to Cundinamarca, Colombia		

== See also ==
- Holocene extinction
- List of North American animals extinct in the Holocene
- List of Antillian and Bermudan animals extinct in the Holocene
- Peopling of the Americas
