= List of recently extinct plants =

- Extinct in the wild (EW): 46 species
- Critically endangered (CR): 6,445 species
- Endangered (EN): 12,707 species
- Vulnerable (VU): 10,596 species
- Near threatened (NT, LR/cd): 4,880 species
- Least concern (LC): 35,732 species
- Data deficient (DD): 6,317 species
Plant species (IUCN, 2025.2)
- 76,864 extant species have been evaluated
- 70,547 of those are fully assessed (Note: excludes data deficient evaluations.)
- 40,612 are not threatened at present
- 29,935 are threatened (Note: Threatened comprises CR, EN and VU.)
- 187 to 892 are extinct or extinct in the wild:
  - 141 extinct (EX) species (Note: Chart omits extinct (EX) species)
  - 46 extinct in the wild (EW)
  - 648 possibly extinct [CR(PE)]
  - 57 possibly extinct in the wild [CR(PEW)]

As of September 2016, the International Union for Conservation of Nature (IUCN) lists 116 recently extinct plant species, 132 possibly extinct species, 36 extinct in the wild species, 13 possibly extinct in the wild species, five extinct subspecies, one extinct in the wild subspecies, and four extinct varieties.

== Algae ==
Extinct species:

- Vanvoorstia bennettiana, Bennett's seaweed

Possibly extinct species:

- Galaxaura barbata
- Phycodrina elegans

== Bryophytes ==
There are three bryophyte extinct species evaluated by the IUCN.

=== Mosses ===
Extinct species:

- Flabellidium spinosum
- Neomacounia nitida

== Pteridophytes ==
Extinct species:

- Adiantum lianxianense
- Dryopteris ascensionis

Possibly extinct species:

- Blotiella coriacea
- Ctenitis pallatangana
- Diplazium ulugurense
- Elaphoglossum gracilipes
- Elaphoglossum polytrichum
- Isoetes heldreichii, Pindus quillwort
- Isoetes sinensis
- Melpomene brevipes

Extinct in the wild species

- Diplazium laffanianum, Governor Laffan's fern

== Gymnosperms ==
Possibly extinct species:

- Encephalartos cerinus, Waxen cycad
- Encephalartos hirsutus, Venda cycad
- Encephalartos inopinus, Lydenburg cycad
- Podocarpus perrieri

Extinct in the wild species:

- Encephalartos brevifoliolatus, Escarpment cycad
- Encephalartos heenanii, Heenan's cycad
- Encephalartos nubimontanus, Blue cycad
- Encephalartos relictus
- Encephalartos woodii, Wood's cycad

== Dicotyledons ==
Extinct species:

- Acacia kingiana
- Acaena exigua
- Acalypha dikuluwensis
- Acalypha rubrinervis, Stringwood
- Acalypha wilderi
- Achyranthes atollensis
- Argocoffeopsis lemblinii
- Argyroxiphium virescens
- Basananthe cupricola
- Begonia eiromischa, Woolly-stalked begonia
- Blutaparon rigidum, Galapagos amaranth
- Byttneria ivorensis
- Campomanesia lundiana
- Casearia quinduensis
- Casearia tinifolia
- Centaurea pseudoleucolepis
- Clermontia multiflora
- Commidendrum gummiferum
- Corynanthe brachythyrsus
- Cupaniopsis crassivalvis
- Cyanea arborea, Tree cyanea
- Cyanea comata
- Cyanea cylindrocalyx
- Cyanea dolichopoda
- Cyanea eleeleensis
- Cyanea giffardii, Giffard's cyanea
- Cyanea linearifolia
- Cyanea mauiensis
- Cyanea minutiflora
- Cyanea parvifolia
- Cyanea pohaku
- Cyanea pycnocarpa
- Cyanea quercifolia, Oakleaf cyanea
- Cyanea sessilifolia
- Cyrtandra olona
- Delilia inelegans
- Delissea niihauensis
- Delissea subcordata
- Delissea undulata, Undulata delissea
- Eugenia acutissima
- Eugenia serrasuela
- Euphrasia mendoncae
- Fitchia mangarevensis
- Galipea ossana
- Gomidesia cambessedeana
- Guettarda retusa
- Heliotropium pannifolium, St Helena heliotrope
- Hernandia drakeana
- Hibiscadelphus bombycinus, Kawaihae hibiscadelphus
- Hibiscadelphus crucibracteatus
- Hibiscadelphus wilderianus
- Hopea shingkeng
- Kokia lanceolata
- Lepidium amissum, Waitakere scurvy grass
- Lepidium obtusatum
- Licania caldasiana
- Logania depressa
- Marshallia grandiflora - Appalachian Barbara's buttons
- Melicope macropus
- Melicope obovata, Obovate melicope
- Myoporum rimatarense
- Myosotis laingii, Waiautoa forget-me-not
- Myrcia neocambessedeana
- Myrcia skeldingii
- Nesiota elliptica, Saint Helena olive
- Oldenlandia adscensionis
- Ormosia howii
- Otophora unilocularis
- Pluchea glutinosa
- Pradosia glaziovii
- Pradosia mutisii
- Psiadia schweinfurthii
- Psidium dumetorum
- Sanicula kauaiensis
- Santalum fernandezianum
- Schiedea amplexicaulis
- Sicyos villosus
- Stellaria elatinoides
- Stenocarpus dumbeensis
- Sterculia khasiana
- Streblorrhiza speciosa
- Syzygium balfourii
- Syzygium humblotii
- Trilepidea adamsii, Adams mistletoe
- Trochetiopsis melanoxylon, St Helena ebony tree
- Valerianella affinis
- Vernonia sechellensis
- Viola cryana
- Weinmannia spiraeoides
- Wikstroemia hanalei
- Wikstroemia skottsbergiana, Skottsberg's wikstroemia
- Xanthostemon sebertii

Possibly extinct species:

- Aeschynomene ruspoliana
- Aetheolaena hypoleuca
- Aetheolaena ledifolia
- Aetheolaena pichinchensis
- Agelanthus rondensis
- Alnus henryi
- Amsinckia marginata
- Anisopappus burundiensis
- Artemisia kauaiensis
- Aspidostemon inconspicuus
- Aster quitensis
- Baccharis fusca
- Betula gynoterminalis
- Callerya neocaledonica
- Canavalia veillonii
- Centropogon brachysiphoniatus
- Clitoria andrei
- Cotula myriophylloides
- Cyanea kolekoleensis
- Cyrtandra crenata
- Dalea sabinalis, Sabinal prairie-clover
- Delissea takeuchii
- Delonix tomentosa
- Devillea flagelliformis
- Dicoma pretoriensis
- Diospyros katendei
- Dorstenia bicaudata
- Dubautia kenwoodii
- Egletes humifusa
- Elaphandra retroflexa
- Eugenia albida
- Eugenia guayaquilensis
- Eugenia scheffleri
- Euphorbia boinensis
- Euphorbia neospinescens
- Euphorbia pirahazo
- Hunteria hexaloba
- Hymenodictyon seyrigii
- Kunkeliella psilotoclada
- Lijndenia brenanii
- Manettia canescens
- Manettia holwayi
- Matelea ecuadorensis
- Miconia longisetosa
- Miconia scabra
- Mikania iserniana
- Mikania seemannii
- Mimosa kitrokala
- Peperomia dauleana
- Peperomia petraea
- Phyllostegia kahiliensis
- Phyllostegia knudsenii
- Piper molliusculum
- Plectranthus scopulicola
- Polygala quitensis
- Prestonia schumanniana
- Rhynchosia ledermannii
- Semecarpus angulatus
- Semecarpus minutipetalus
- Semecarpus sandakanus
- Senecio navugabensis
- Siphocampylus loxensis
- Solanum semicoalitum
- Stereospermum zenkeri
- Tournefortia obtusiflora
- Triaspis schliebenii
- Uvaria decidua
- Viburnum divaricatum
- Xylosma serrata

Extinct in the wild species:

- Brugmansia arborea
- Brugmansia aurea
- Brugmansia insignis
- Brugmansia sanguinea
- Brugmansia suaveolens
- Brugmansia versicolor
- Brugmansia vulcanicola
- Cyanea pinnatifida
- Cyanea superba, Superb cyanea
- Cyrtandra waiolani, Fuzzyflower cyrtandra
- Erythroxylum echinodendron
- Euphorbia mayurnathanii
- Franklinia alatamaha, Franklin tree
- Kokia cookei, Cooke's kokio
- Lachanodes arborea, She cabbage tree
- Lysimachia minoricensis
- Mangifera casturi, Kalimantan mango
- Ochrosia brownii
- Rhododendron kanehirai
- Senecio leucopeplus
- Sophora toromiro, Toromiro
- Trochetiopsis erythroxylon, St Helena redwood

Possibly extinct in the wild species:

- Delissea rhytidosperma
- Discocactus subterraneo-proliferans
- Kadua haupuensis
- Kanaloa kahoolawensis
- Magnolia wolfii
- Mirabella estevesii
- Schiedea attenuata
- Silene perlmanii
- Stenogyne bifida
- Stenogyne campanulata
- Stenogyne kanehoana

Extinct subspecies:

- Cyanea copelandii subsp. copelandii
- Cyanea superba subsp. regina
- Delissea subcordata subsp. obtusifolia
- Delissea subcordata subsp. subcordata
- Tetramolopium consanguineum subsp. consanguineum

Extinct in the wild subspecies:

- Cyanea superba subsp. superba

Extinct varieties:

- Euphorbia celastroides var. tomentella
- Euphorbia remyi var. hanaleiensis
- Ryania speciosa var. mutisii

== Monocotyledons ==
Extinct species:

- Cyperus rockii
- Musa fitzalanii
- Govenia floridana
- Oeceoclades seychellarum
- Sporobolus durus
- Podophorus bromoides

Possibly extinct species:

- Aechmea cymosopaniculata
- Aeranthes albidiflora
- Andropogon benthamianus
- Angraecum mahavavense
- Angraecum muscicolum
- Angraecum perhumile
- Angraecum potamophilum
- Angraecum rigidifolium
- Angraecum rubellum
- Angraecum serpens
- Angraecum sterrophyllum
- Benthamia nigro-vaginata
- Bulbophyllum erythroglossum
- Bulbophyllum hirsutiusculum
- Bulbophyllum minax
- Bulbophyllum sanguineum
- Bulbophyllum tampoketsense
- Cynorkis bimaculata
- Cynorkis catatii
- Cynorkis rolfei
- Cynorkis sylvatica
- Cynorkis usambarae
- Cyperus chionocephalus
- Diaphananthe orientalis
- Disperis bosseri
- Disperis egregia
- Dypsis brittiana
- Eleocharis lepta
- Eulophia grandidieri
- Guzmania lepidota
- Guzmania poortmanii
- Guzmania striata
- Panicum pearsonii
- Philodendron balaoanum
- Polystachya acuminata
- Polystachya canaliculata
- Polystachya porphyrochila
- Polystachya rugosilabia
- Tridactyle sarcodantha

Extinct in the wild species:

- Bromus bromoideus
- Corypha taliera

Possibly extinct in the wild species:

- Costus vinosus

Extinct varieties

- Cenchrus agrimonioides var. laysanensis

== See also ==
- List of least concern plants
- List of near threatened plants
- List of vulnerable plants
- List of endangered plants
- List of critically endangered plants
- List of data deficient plants
