= Bulbophyllum sect. Kinethrix =

Scientific classification
- Kingdom: Plantae
- Clade: Tracheophytes
- Clade: Angiosperms
- Clade: Monocots
- Order: Asparagales
- Family: Orchidaceae
- Subfamily: Epidendroideae
- Genus: Bulbophyllum
- Section: Bulbophyllum sect. Kinethrix; Schltr. 1918

Type species
- Bulbophyllum mirificum

Species
- See text

Synonyms
- Bulbophyllum sect. Kainochilus Schltr.

Section of flowering plants

Bulbophyllum sect. Kinethrix is a section of the genus Bulbophyllum.

== Description ==
Species in this section with creeping rhizomes that have laterally flattened pseudobulbs with two leaves.

== Distribution ==
Plants from this section are found in Madagascar.

== Species ==
Bulbophyllum section Kinethrix comprises the following species:

Image	Name	Distribution	Elevation (m)
	Bulbophyllum alexandrae Schltr. 1925	Madagascar	700–2,000 metres (2,300–6,600 ft)
	Bulbophyllum anjozorobeense Bosser 2000	Madagascar	900–1,200 metres (3,000–3,900 ft)
	Bulbophyllum cylindrocarpum Frapp. ex Cordem. 1895	Madagascar & Reunion	1,500–1,800 metres (4,900–5,900 ft)
	Bulbophyllum edentatum H.Perrier 1937	Madagascar	1,100–1,800 metres (3,600–5,900 ft)
	Bulbophyllum erythroglossum Bosser 2000	Madagascar	900–1,100 metres (3,000–3,600 ft)
	Bulbophyllum horizontale Bosser 1965	Madagascar	900 metres (3,000 ft)
	Bulbophyllum imerinense Schltr. 1925	Madagascar	1,000–1,300 metres (3,300–4,300 ft)
	Bulbophyllum jeanbosseri Gamisch & Hermans 2021	Madagascar	900–1,700 metres (3,000–5,600 ft)
	Bulbophyllum lemurense Bosser & P.J.Cribb 1999	Madagascar	1,400 metres (4,600 ft)
	Bulbophyllum mirificum Schltr. 1918	Madagascar	
	Bulbophyllum multiligulatum H.Perrier 1937	Madagascar	1,000–1,500 metres (3,300–4,900 ft)
	Bulbophyllum reflexiflorum H.Perrier 1937	Madagascar	2,000–2,400 metres (6,600–7,900 ft)
