= List of Ctenitis species =

Ctenitis is a genus of ferns in the family Dryopteridaceae. They are found throughout the tropics, except for Australia.

As of November 2026, the Checklist of Ferns and Lycophytes of the World recognized 145 species. World Flora Online recognized 148, and Plants of the World Online 147. Plants of the World Online recognizes the former Atalopteris ekmanii and A. maxonii as distinct from C. cubensis, although they do not have combinations in Ctenitis. World Flora Online has duplicate entries for C. crinita, C. decurrenti-pinnata and a spelling error for C. ferruginea.

== Species ==
=== A ===
- Ctenitis abyssi (Sehnem) Salino & P.O.Morais
- Ctenitis aciculata (Baker) Ching
- Ctenitis alteroblumei Holttum
- Ctenitis ameristoneuros (Fée) Greuter & R.Rankin
- Ctenitis ampla (Humb. & Bonpl. ex Willd.) Ching
- Ctenitis analamazaotrensis (Rakotondr.) Hennequin & Rouhan
- Ctenitis angusta Holttum
- Ctenitis anniesii (Rosenst.) Copel.
- Ctenitis apicalis (Baker) F.Ballard
- Ctenitis arthrothrix (Hook.) Tardieu
- Ctenitis aspidioides (C.Presl) Copel.
- Ctenitis atrorubens Holttum

=== B ===
- Ctenitis baulensis A.R.Sm.
- Ctenitis biformis (Mett.) Tardieu
- Ctenitis bigarellae Schwartsb., Labiak & Salino
- Ctenitis bivestita (Tausch) Tardieu
- Ctenitis blepharochlamys (C.Chr.) Tardieu
- Ctenitis boholensis Holttum
- Ctenitis borbonica (Baker) Tardieu
- Ctenitis brevipetiolulata Li Bing Zhang & Yi F.Duan
- Ctenitis bullata A.R.Sm.
- Ctenitis bullescens Rouhan, Li Bing Zhang & Yi F.Duan
- Ctenitis bulusanica Holttum

=== C ===
- Ctenitis calcicola M.Kato
- Ctenitis cerea Li Bing Zhang & Yi F.Duan
- Ctenitis cheilanthina (C.Chr.) C.V.Morton
- Ctenitis chiapasensis (Christ) A.R.Sm.
- Ctenitis chiriquiana (C.Chr.) Lellinger
- Ctenitis christensenii R.S.Viveros & Salino
- Ctenitis cirrhosa (Schumach.) Ching
- Ctenitis clathrata M.Kato
- Ctenitis comorensis Li Bing Zhang & Yi F.Duan
- Ctenitis coriacea M.Kato
- Ctenitis crinigera (C.Chr.) Hennequin & Rouhan
- Ctenitis crinita (Poir.) Ching
- Ctenitis croftii Holttum
- Ctenitis crystallina (Kunze) Proctor
- Ctenitis cubensis C.Sánchez
- Ctenitis cumingii Holttum
- Ctenitis cyclochlamys (Fée) Holttum

=== D ===
- Ctenitis decaryana (C.Chr.) Hennequin & Rouhan
- Ctenitis decurrenti-pinnata (Ching) Tardieu & C.Chr.
- Ctenitis deflexa (Kaulf.) Copel.
- Ctenitis dentata Li Bing Zhang & Yi F.Duan
- Ctenitis desvauxii Tardieu
- Ctenitis dianguiensis (W.M.Chu & H.G.Zhou) S.Y.Dong
- Ctenitis dingnanensis Ching
- Ctenitis distans (Brack.) Ching
- Ctenitis dolphinensis Proctor
- Ctenitis dumrongii Tagawa & K.Iwats.

=== E, F ===
- Ctenitis eatonii (Baker) Ching
- Ctenitis elata Holttum
- Ctenitis equestris (Kunze) Ching
- Ctenitis erinacea A.R.Sm.
- Ctenitis eriocaulos (Fée) Alston
- Ctenitis erythradenia Holttum
- Ctenitis exaggerata (Baker) Ching
- Ctenitis excelsa (Desv.) Proctor
- Ctenitis falciculata (Raddi) Ching
- Ctenitis fenestralis (C.Chr.) Copel.
- Ctenitis fibrillosa (Baker) Li Bing Zhang & Yi F.Duan
- Ctenitis fijiensis (Hook.) Copel.
- Ctenitis flexuosa (Fée) Copel.

=== G, H, I, J ===
- Ctenitis glandulosa R.S.Viveros & Salino
- Ctenitis grisebachii (Baker) Ching
- Ctenitis guidianensis H.G.Zhou & W.M.Chu
- Ctenitis harrisii Proctor
- Ctenitis hemsleyana (Baker) Copel.
- Ctenitis hirta (Sw.) Ching
- Ctenitis hispida (Kuhn) Li Bing Zhang & Yi F.Duan
- Ctenitis humida (Cordem.) Holttum
- Ctenitis humilis Holttum
- Ctenitis interjecta (C.Chr.) Ching
- Ctenitis iriomotensis (H.Itô) Nakaike
- Ctenitis jinfoshanensis Ching & Z.Y.Liu
- Ctenitis jouyana (Rakotondr.) Hennequin & Rouhan

=== K, L ===
- Ctenitis kinabaluensis Holttum
- Ctenitis kjellbergii (C.Chr.) Ching
- Ctenitis koordersii Holttum
- Ctenitis laetevirens (Rosenst.) Salino & P.O.Morais
- Ctenitis lanceolata (Baker) A.R.Sm.
- Ctenitis latifrons (Brack.) Copel.
- Ctenitis leonii A.Rojas
- Ctenitis lepigera (Baker) Tagawa
- Ctenitis longivillosa Li Bing Zhang & Yi F.Duan
- Ctenitis lorencei Holttum

=== M ===
- Ctenitis madagascariensis Tardieu
- Ctenitis magna (Baker) Tardieu
- Ctenitis mannii (C.Hope) Ching
- Ctenitis marginalisora Li Bing Zhang & Yi F.Duan
- Ctenitis maritima (Cordem.) Tardieu
- Ctenitis mayottensis Li Bing Zhang & Yi F.Duan
- Ctenitis megalastriformis R.S.Viveros & Salino
- Ctenitis melanochlamys (Fée) Ching
- Ctenitis melanosticta (Kunze) Copel.
- Ctenitis meridionalis (Poir.) Ching
- Ctenitis mexicana A.R.Sm.
- Ctenitis microchlaena (Fée) Stolze
- Ctenitis microlepigera (Nakai) Ching
- Ctenitis minutiloba Holttum
- Ctenitis multilobata Li Bing Zhang, Yi F.Duan & Rouhan
- Ctenitis muluensis Holttum

=== N, O, P, R ===
- Ctenitis nemorosa (Willd.) Ching
- Ctenitis nervata (Fée) R.S.Viveros & Salino
- Ctenitis nigrovenia (Christ) Copel.
- Ctenitis oophylla (C.Chr.) Ching
- Ctenitis palatangana (Hook.) Ching
- Ctenitis paleolata Copel.
- Ctenitis pallens (Brack.) M.G.Price
- Ctenitis paranaensis (C.Chr.) Lellinger
- Ctenitis parvula Proctor
- Ctenitis pauciflora (Kaulf. ex Spreng.) Holttum
- Ctenitis propinqua (J.Sm. ex C.Presl) Copel.
- Ctenitis pseudorhodolepis Ching & Chu H.Wang
- Ctenitis rapensis (E.D.Br.) Holttum
- Ctenitis refulgens (Mett.) Vareschi
- Ctenitis reunionensis Hennequin, Li Bing Zhang & Yi F.Duan

=== S ===
- Ctenitis samoensis (C.Chr.) Holttum
- Ctenitis santae-clarae (C.Chr.) Ching
- Ctenitis sciaphila (Maxon) Ching
- Ctenitis seramensis Holttum
- Ctenitis setosa (C.Presl) Holttum
- Ctenitis sieberiana (Kaulf. ex Spreng.) Hennequin & Rouhan
- Ctenitis silvatica Holttum
- Ctenitis sinii (Ching) Ohwi
- Ctenitis sparsa Li Bing Zhang & Yi F.Duan
- Ctenitis spekei (Baker) Li Bing Zhang & Yi F.Duan
- Ctenitis squamigera (Hook. & Arn.) Copel.
- Ctenitis strigilosa (Davenp.) Copel.
- Ctenitis subconnexa (Christ) Holttum
- Ctenitis subcrenulata (Baker) Li Bing Zhang, Rouhan & Yi F.Duan
- Ctenitis subdryopteris (Christ) Lellinger
- Ctenitis subglandulosa (Hance) Ching
- Ctenitis submarginalis (Langsd. & Fisch.) Ching
- Ctenitis subobscura (Christ) Holttum
- Ctenitis sumbawensis Holttum

=== T, U, V, W ===
- Ctenitis tabacifera (Alderw.) Ching
- Ctenitis tardieu-blotiae Li Bing Zhang & Yi F.Duan
- Ctenitis thwaitesii Holttum
- Ctenitis truncicola (C.Chr.) Ching
- Ctenitis ursina A.R.Sm.
- Ctenitis velata (Kunze ex Mett.) R.M.Tryon & A.F.Tryon
- Ctenitis vellea (Willd.) Proctor
- Ctenitis vilis (Kunze) Ching
- Ctenitis warburii (C.Chr.) Tardieu
