= Pauoa =

Pauoa may refer to:

- Pauoa, a residential district of Honolulu, Hawaii
- Ctenitis squamigera, the Pacific lacefern, or pauoa
