= Aetheolaena involucrata =

Conservation status
- Least Concern (IUCN 3.1)

Scientific classification
- Kingdom: Plantae
- Clade: Tracheophytes
- Clade: Angiosperms
- Clade: Eudicots
- Clade: Asterids
- Order: Asterales
- Family: Asteraceae
- Genus: Aetheolaena
- Species: A. involucrata

Binomial name
- Aetheolaena involucrata (Kunth) B.Nord.

Species of flowering plant

Aetheolaena involucrata is a species of flowering plant in the aster family, Asteraceae. It is endemic to Ecuador, where it is considered to be "characteristic" of the Andean flora.

This plant is a subshrub or vine which grows in forest and shrubland habitat at altitudes up to 4500 meters. It is widely distributed and grows in several protected areas.
