= Aetheolaena subinvolucrata =

Conservation status
- Endangered (IUCN 3.1)

Scientific classification
- Kingdom: Plantae
- Clade: Tracheophytes
- Clade: Angiosperms
- Clade: Eudicots
- Clade: Asterids
- Order: Asterales
- Family: Asteraceae
- Genus: Aetheolaena
- Species: A. subinvolucrata

Binomial name
- Aetheolaena subinvolucrata (Cuatrec.) B.Nord.

Species of flowering plant

Aetheolaena subinvolucrata is a species of flowering plant in the family Asteraceae. It is found only in Ecuador. Its natural habitat is subtropical or tropical moist montane forests. It is threatened by habitat loss.
