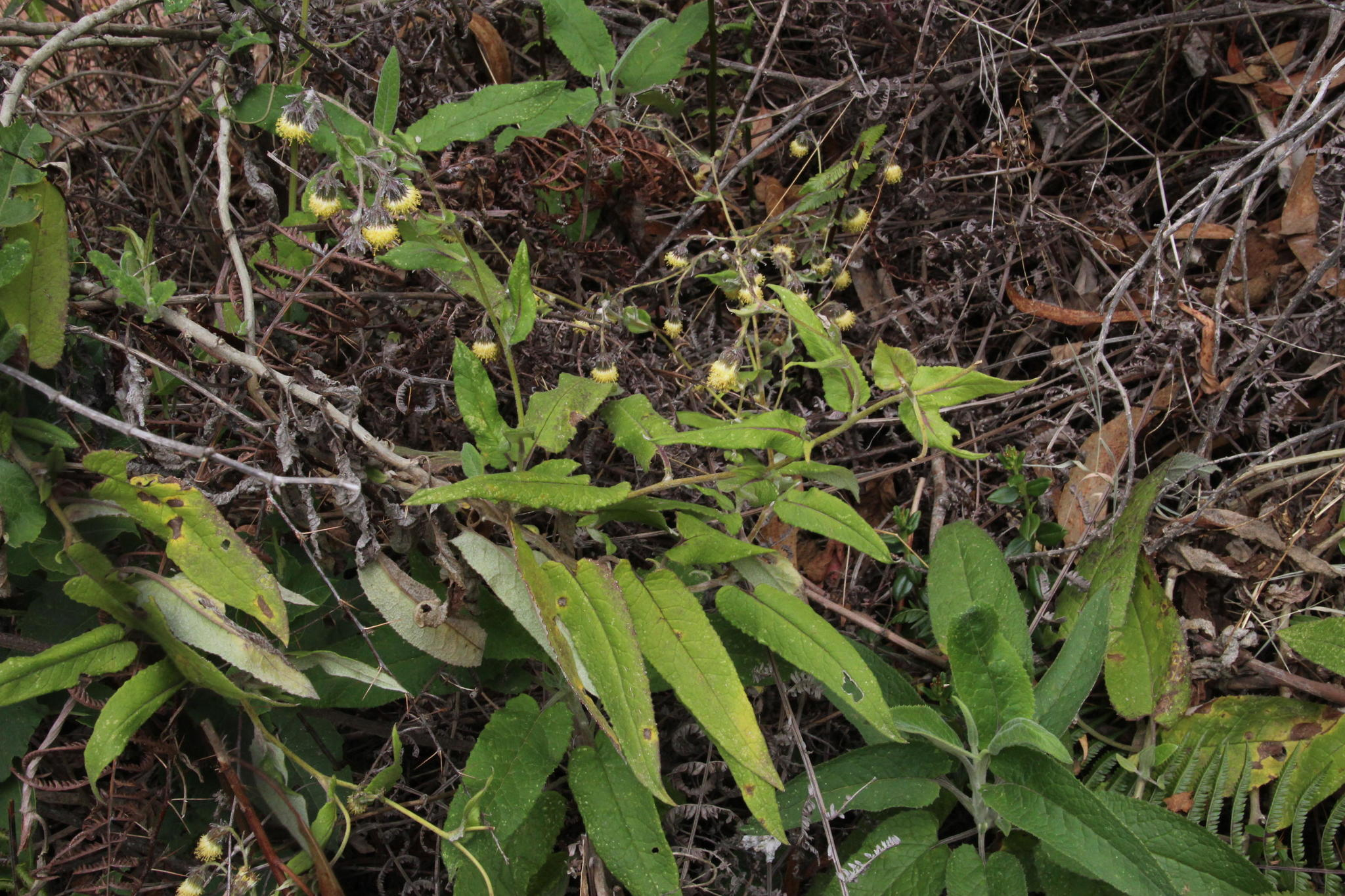
- Aetheolaena campanulata

Scientific classification
- Kingdom: Plantae
- Clade: Tracheophytes
- Clade: Angiosperms
- Clade: Eudicots
- Clade: Asterids
- Order: Asterales
- Family: Asteraceae
- Subfamily: Asteroideae
- Tribe: Senecioneae
- Subtribe: Senecioninae
- Genus: Aetheolaena; Cass.

= Aetheolaena =

Genus of flowering plants

Aetheolaena is a genus of flowering plants in family Asteraceae. It includes 27 species native to high-elevation montane forest in the northern and central Andes, ranging from Venezuela through Colombia, Ecuador, and Peru to Bolivia.

== Species ==
27 species are accepted.

- Aetheolaena alatopetiolata (J.Calvo, E.Freire & Sklenář) Pruski
- Aetheolaena betonicifolia (DC.) Pruski
- Aetheolaena caldasensis (Cuatrec.) B.Nord.
- Aetheolaena campanulata (Sch.Bip.) B.Nord.
- Aetheolaena cuencana (Hieron.) B.Nord.
- Aetheolaena decipiens (Benoist) B.Nord.
- Aetheolaena doryphylla (Cuatrec.) B.Nord.
- Aetheolaena gargantana (Cuatrec.) Pruski
- Aetheolaena heterophylla (Turcz.) B.Nord.
- Aetheolaena hypoleuca (Turcz.) B.Nord.
- Aetheolaena involucrata Cass.
- Aetheolaena josei (Sklenář) Pruski
- Aetheolaena ledifolia (Kunth) B.Nord.
- Aetheolaena lingulata (D.F.K.Schltdl.) B.Nord.
- Aetheolaena loeseneri (Hieron.) B.Nord.
- Aetheolaena longepenicillata (Sch.Bip. ex Sandwith) B.Nord.
- Aetheolaena mochensis (Hieron.) B.Nord.
- Aetheolaena mojandensis (Hieron. ex Sodiro) B.Nord.
- Aetheolaena otophora (Wedd.) B.Nord.
- Aetheolaena patens (Kunth) B.Nord.
- Aetheolaena pichinchensis (Cuatrec.) B.Nord.
- Aetheolaena piedrahitae (J.Calvo & F.Ávila) Pruski
- Aetheolaena puracensis (Cuatrec.) B.Nord.
- Aetheolaena rosana (Cuatrec.) B.Nord.
- Aetheolaena senecioides (Kunth) B.Nord.
- Aetheolaena subinvolucrata (Cuatrec.) B.Nord.
- Aetheolaena yacuanguensis (Cuatrec.) B.Nord.
