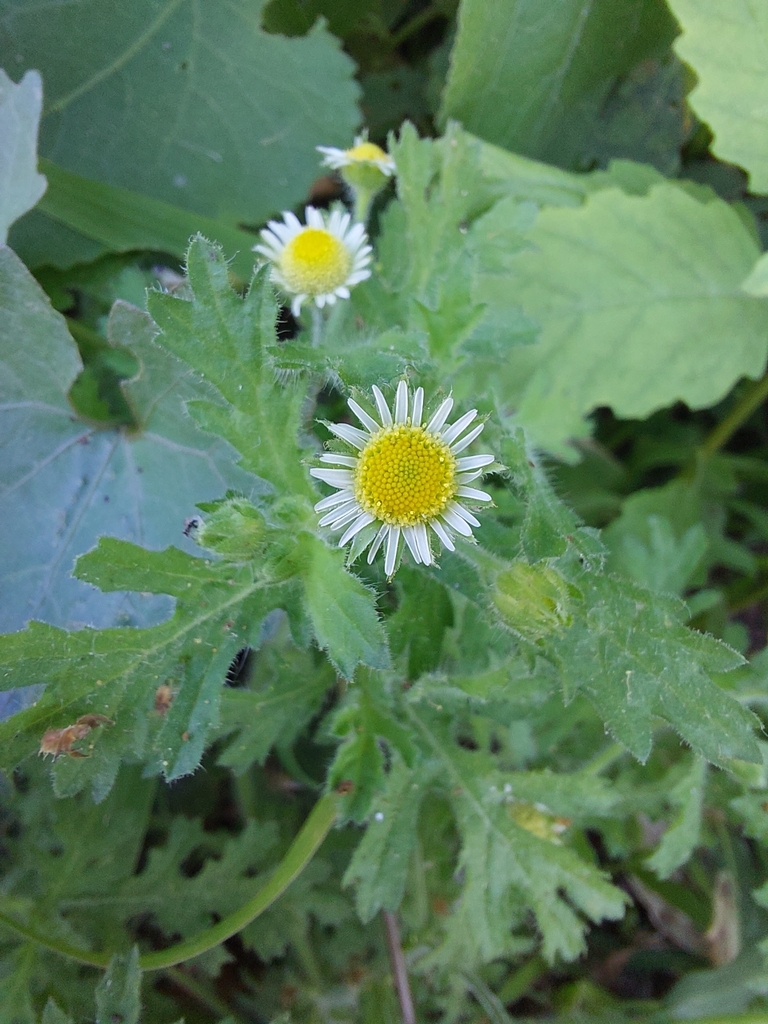

Scientific classification
- Kingdom: Plantae
- Clade: Tracheophytes
- Clade: Angiosperms
- Clade: Eudicots
- Clade: Asterids
- Order: Asterales
- Family: Asteraceae
- Genus: Egletes
- Species: E. viscosa

Binomial name
- Egletes viscosa (L.) Less.

Synonyms
- Cotula viscosa L.; Egletes viscosa var. dissecta Shinners; Egletes viscosa var. sprucei Baker; Platystephium graveolens Gardner; Grangea domingensis var. viscosa (L.) M. Gómez

= Egletes viscosa =

Species of flowering plant

Egletes viscosa, the erect tropical daisy, is a New World species of flowering plant in the family Asteraceae. It is widespread across much of South America, Central America, Mexico, and the West Indies, just barely crossing the US border into the southernmost county in Texas (Cameron County).

Egletes viscosa is an annual, aromatic herb up to 60 cm (2 feet) tall, covered with glandular and non-glandular hairs. One plant can produce several flower heads, each with white or pale blue ray florets and yellow disc florets.
