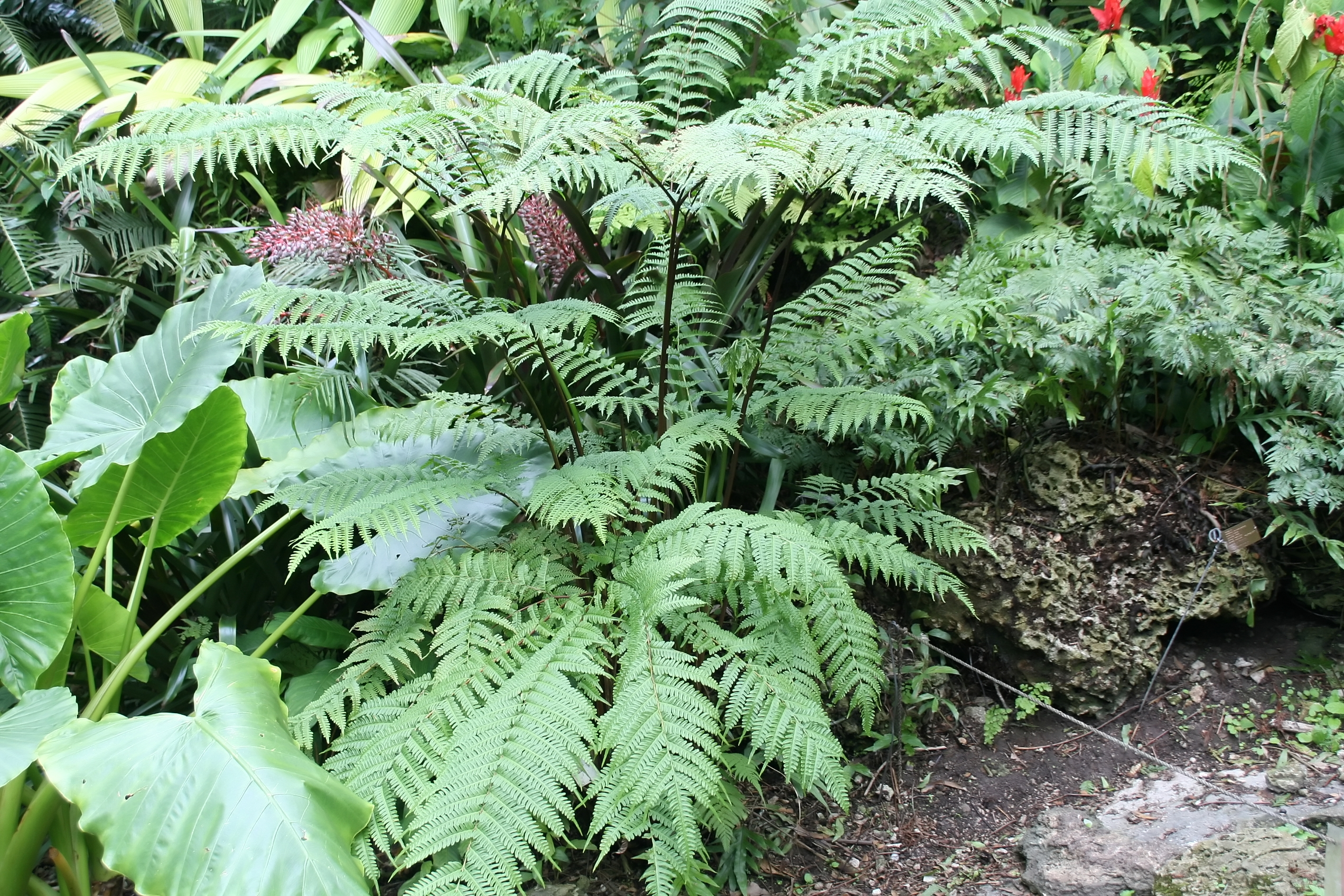
- Growing at the Fairchild Tropical Botanic Garden in Miami, FL, USA

Scientific classification
- Kingdom: Plantae
- Clade: Tracheophytes
- Division: Polypodiophyta
- Class: Polypodiopsida
- Order: Polypodiales
- Suborder: Polypodiineae
- Family: Dryopteridaceae
- Genus: Ctenitis
- Species: C. sloanei

Binomial name
- Ctenitis sloanei (Poepp. ex Spreng.) Morton

Synonyms
- Synonymy: Ctenitis ampla?; Dryopteris ampla

= Ctenitis sloanei =

Species of plant

Ctenitis sloanei (commonly known as the Florida tree fern, red hair comb fern, Bermuda cave fern, or Florida lacefern) is a species of wood fern native to USA (Florida), Bermuda, Cuba, the Caribbean, Mexico, Central America, and northwestern South America. Although it does not belong to the order Cyatheales (the group that contains most tree ferns), it is still considered by some to be a type of tree fern. This would make it the only tree fern native to the continental United States (the parts of the US that exclude Hawaii, Alaska and overseas territories). A member of the genus Ctenitis, it was formerly classified under the genus Dryopteris as Dryopteris ampla. The population of this fern has been damaged and it is noted to possibly be endangered.

== Description ==
Ctenitis sloanei mainly grows in moist tropical hammocks and near exposed limestone. It is a perennial which grows up to 1.21 meters (4 ft) tall on average. The fern is also evergreen.
