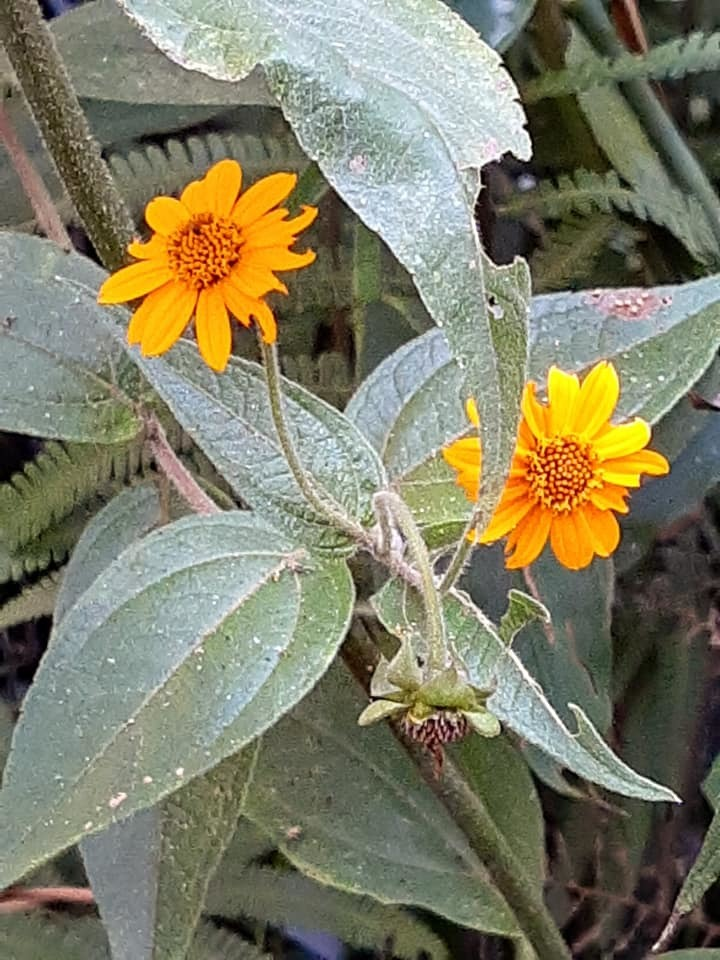

Scientific classification
- Kingdom: Plantae
- Clade: Embryophytes
- Clade: Tracheophytes
- Clade: Spermatophytes
- Clade: Angiosperms
- Clade: Eudicots
- Clade: Asterids
- Order: Asterales
- Family: Asteraceae
- Subfamily: Asteroideae
- Tribe: Heliantheae
- Subtribe: Ecliptinae
- Genus: Elaphandra; Strother

Type species
- Elaphandra bicornis Strother

= Elaphandra =

Genus of flowering plants

Elaphandra is a genus of flowering plants in the family Asteraceae.

species

The genus is primarily native to South America, with one species extending into Trinidad and Tobago and another into Panama.

- Elaphandra archeri (H.Rob. & Brettell) H.Rob. - Colombia
- Elaphandra bicornis Strother - Panamá
- Elaphandra eggersii (Hieron.) H.Rob. - Ecuador
- Elaphandra falconiensis (V.M.Badillo) H.Rob. - Venezuela
- Elaphandra lehmannii (Hieron.) Pruski - Ecuador, Colombia
- Elaphandra lucidula (S.F.Blake) H.Rob. - Bolivia
- Elaphandra macrolepis (S.F.Blake) H.Rob. - Colombia
- Elaphandra moriana Pruski - French Guiana
- Elaphandra pastazensis (H.Rob.) H.Rob. - Ecuador
- Elaphandra patentipilis (S.F.Blake) Pruski & G.P.Méndez - Colombia
- Elaphandra paucipunctata H.Rob. - Ecuador
- Elaphandra quinquenervis (S.F.Blake) H.Rob. - Ecuador, Colombia
- Elaphandra retroflexa (S.F. Blake) H. Rob. - Ecuador
- Elaphandra ulei (Hieron.) H.Rob. - Bolivia, Brazil (Amazonas, Pará, Rondônia, Tocantins)
- Elaphandra verbesinoides (A.DC.) H.Rob. - Venezuela, Trinidad and Tobago
