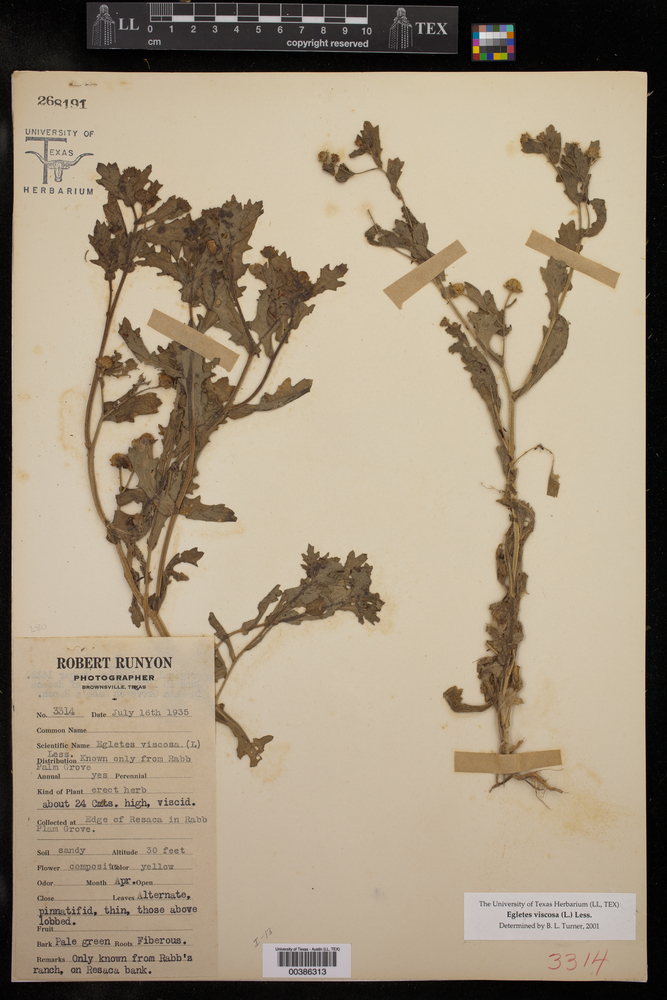
- Egletes viscosa

Scientific classification
- Kingdom: Plantae
- Clade: Tracheophytes
- Clade: Angiosperms
- Clade: Eudicots
- Clade: Asterids
- Order: Asterales
- Family: Asteraceae
- Subfamily: Asteroideae
- Tribe: Astereae
- Subtribe: Egletinae; G.L.Nesom
- Genus: Egletes; Cass.

Type species
- Egletes domingensis Cass.

Synonyms
- Eyselia Reichb.; Xerobius Cass.; Platystephium Gardner

= Egletes =

Genus of flowering plants

Egletes (tropic daisy) is a genus of flowering plants in the family Asteraceae. It is native to South America, Mesoamerica, and the West Indies, with the range of one species barely crossing the US border into the extreme southern part of Texas.

Species

- Egletes domingensis Cass. - Hispaniola
- Egletes floribunda Poepp. - Amazonas State in Brazil
- Egletes florida Shinners - Venezuela, Guyana, Trinidad and Tobago
- Egletes humifusa Less. - Ecuador
- Egletes liebmannii Sch.Bip. ex Hemsl. - Guatemala, Honduras, Belize, Mexico
- Egletes obovata Benth. ex Oerst. - Colombia
- Egletes prostrata (Sw.) Kuntze - West Indies, Guyana, Venezuela, Colombia, northern Brazil
- Egletes repens Shinners - Venezuela, Colombia
- Egletes tenuifolia Cuatrec. - Colombia
- Egletes viscosa (L.) Less. - Texas, Mexico, Central America, West Indies, South America
