= Elaphandra paucipunctata =

Conservation status
- Endangered (IUCN 3.1)

Scientific classification
- Kingdom: Plantae
- Clade: Tracheophytes
- Clade: Angiosperms
- Clade: Eudicots
- Clade: Asterids
- Order: Asterales
- Family: Asteraceae
- Tribe: Heliantheae
- Genus: Elaphandra
- Species: E. paucipunctata

Binomial name
- Elaphandra paucipunctata H.Rob.

Species of flowering plant

Elaphandra paucipunctata is a species of flowering plant in the family Asteraceae. It is found only in Ecuador. Its natural habitats are subtropical or tropical dry forests and subtropical or tropical moist montane forests. It is threatened by habitat loss.
