= Elaphandra pastazensis =

Conservation status
- Near Threatened (IUCN 3.1)

Scientific classification
- Kingdom: Plantae
- Clade: Tracheophytes
- Clade: Angiosperms
- Clade: Eudicots
- Clade: Asterids
- Order: Asterales
- Family: Asteraceae
- Tribe: Heliantheae
- Genus: Elaphandra
- Species: E. pastazensis

Binomial name
- Elaphandra pastazensis (H.Rob.) H.Rob.

Species of flowering plant

Elaphandra pastazensis is a species of flowering plant in the family Asteraceae. It is found only in Ecuador. Its natural habitat is subtropical or tropical moist lowland forests. It is threatened by habitat loss.
