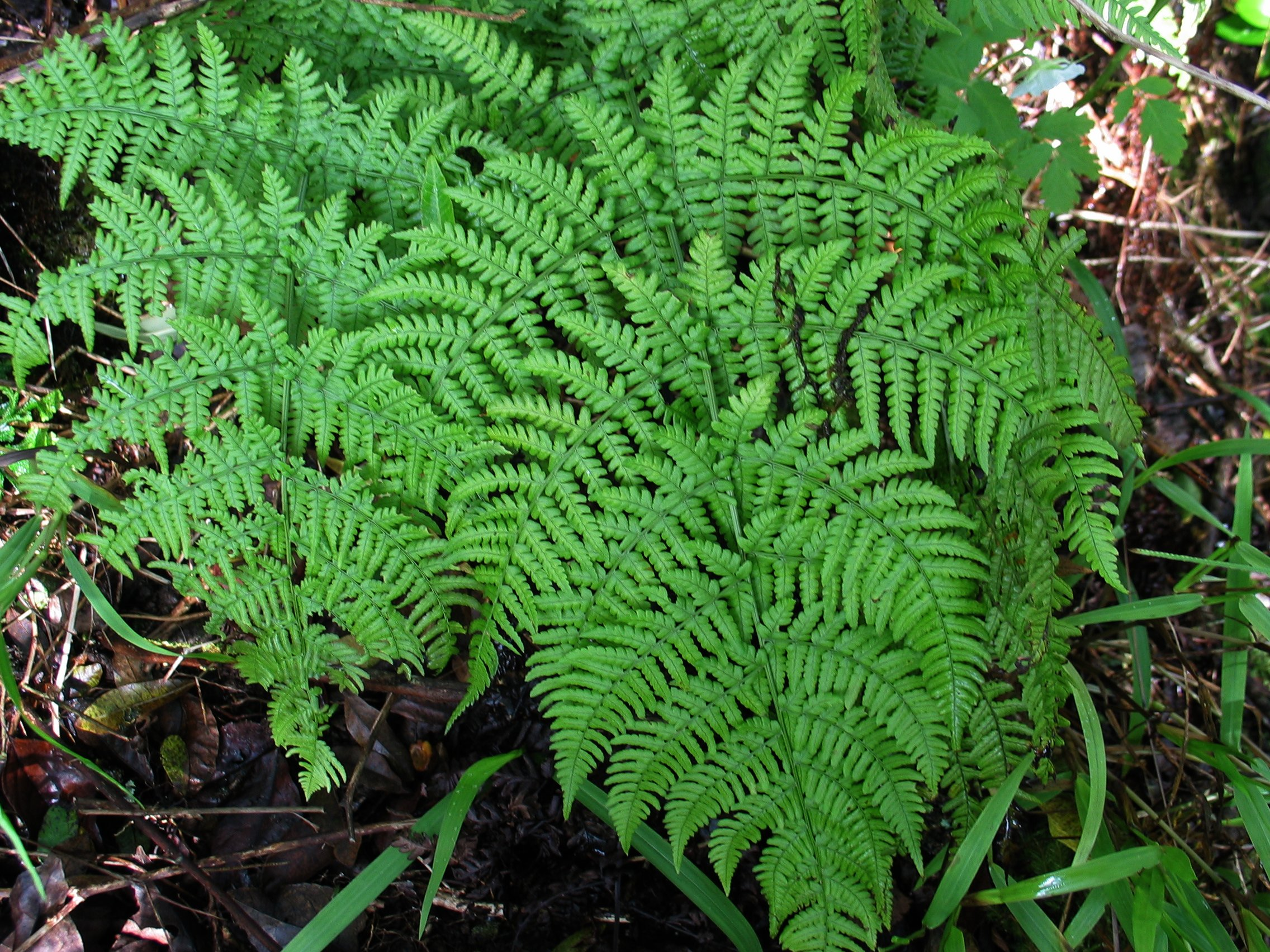

Scientific classification
- Kingdom: Plantae
- Clade: Tracheophytes
- Division: Polypodiophyta
- Class: Polypodiopsida
- Order: Polypodiales
- Suborder: Polypodiineae
- Family: Dryopteridaceae
- Subfamily: Dryopteridoideae
- Genus: Ctenitis (C.Chr.) C.Chr.

Synonyms
- Ataxipteris Holttum; Dryopteris subg. Ctenitis C.Chr.; Pseudotectaria Tardieu

= Ctenitis =

Genus of ferns

Ctenitis is a fern genus in the family Dryopteridaceae, subfamily Dryopteridoideae, in the Pteridophyte Phylogeny Group classification of 2016 (PPG I).

== Selected species ==
The genus has a large number of species. The PPG I classification suggested that there were about 125 species; as of February 2020, the Checklist of Ferns and Lycophytes of the World listed 143.

- Ctenitis pallatangana (Hook.) Ching
- Ctenitis sloanei (Poepp. ex Spreng.) Morton
- Ctenitis squamigera (Brack.) Copel.
