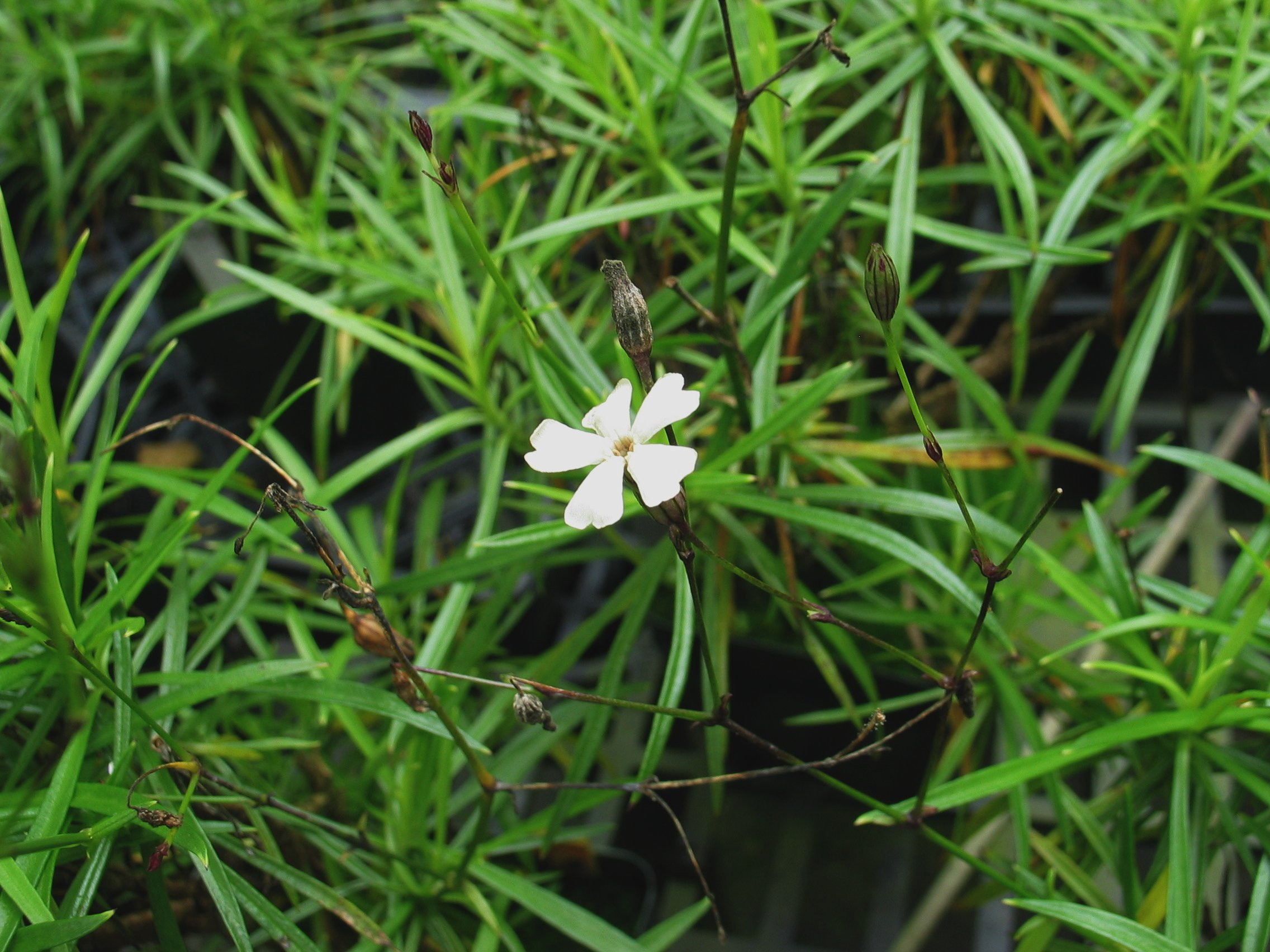

Conservation status
- Critically endangered, possibly extinct in the wild (IUCN 3.1)

- Critically Imperiled (NatureServe)

Scientific classification
- Kingdom: Plantae
- Clade: Tracheophytes
- Clade: Angiosperms
- Clade: Eudicots
- Order: Caryophyllales
- Family: Caryophyllaceae
- Genus: Silene
- Species: S. perlmanii

Binomial name
- Silene perlmanii W.L.Wagner, D.R.Herbst & Sohmer

= Silene perlmanii =

Species of flowering plant

Silene perlmanii is a rare species of flowering plant in the family Caryophyllaceae known by the common name cliff-face catchfly. It is endemic to Hawaii, where it is known only from the southern Waiʻanae Range of Oahu. Today there are no plants left in the wild. The species is in cultivation at the National Tropical Botanical Garden. It is a federally listed endangered species of the United States.

This white-flowered subshrub was first discovered in 1987. When it was placed on the Endangered Species List in 1991 there were 10 to 20 individuals known to exist, growing on cliff faces in the moist forests of the Waiʻanae Range. By 1997 these were gone. The plant exists in cultivation, and several individuals have been outplanted in appropriate habitat. As of 2008 three of these have survived. They are protected inside fenced enclosures.
