= Pristimantis anotis =

Conservation status
- Critically endangered, possibly extinct (IUCN 3.1)

Scientific classification
- Kingdom: Animalia
- Phylum: Chordata
- Class: Amphibia
- Order: Anura
- Family: Strabomantidae
- Genus: Pristimantis
- Species: P. anotis

Binomial name
- Pristimantis anotis (Walker & Test, 1955)

Synonyms
- Eleutherodactylus anotis Walker & Test, 1955

Species of frog

Pristimantis anotis is a species of frog in the family Strabomantidae. It is endemic to Venezuela. Its natural habitats are tropical moist montane forests and rivers.
