= Campo Grande tree frog =

Conservation status
- Extinct (2023) (IUCN 3.1)

Scientific classification
- Kingdom: Animalia
- Phylum: Chordata
- Class: Amphibia
- Order: Anura
- Family: Hylidae
- Genus: Boana
- Species: †B. cymbalum

Binomial name
- †Boana cymbalum (Bokermann, 1963)

Synonyms
- Hypsiboas cymbalum (Bokermann, 1963)

Species of amphibian

The Campo Grande tree frog (Boana cymbalum) is a species of frog in the family Hylidae endemic to Brazil. Its natural habitats were subtropical or tropical moist lowland forests and rivers. It went extinct due to habitat loss.
