= Bulbophyllum reflexiflorum =

Scientific classification
- Kingdom: Plantae
- Clade: Tracheophytes
- Clade: Angiosperms
- Clade: Monocots
- Order: Asparagales
- Family: Orchidaceae
- Subfamily: Epidendroideae
- Genus: Bulbophyllum
- Species: B. reflexiflorum

Binomial name
- Bulbophyllum reflexiflorum H.Perrier

Synonyms
- Bulbophyllum inauditum Schltr. 1925; Bulbophyllum comosum H.Perrier 1937

Species of orchid

Bulbophyllum reflexiflorum is a species of orchid in the genus Bulbophyllum.
