= Guzmania lepidota =

Conservation status
- Critically endangered, possibly extinct (IUCN 3.1)

Scientific classification
- Kingdom: Plantae
- Clade: Tracheophytes
- Clade: Angiosperms
- Clade: Monocots
- Clade: Commelinids
- Order: Poales
- Family: Bromeliaceae
- Genus: Guzmania
- Species: G. lepidota

Binomial name
- Guzmania lepidota (André) André ex Mez

Synonyms
- Caraguata lepidota André

Species of flowering plant

Guzmania lepidota is a species of flowering plant in the family Bromeliaceae. It is endemic to Ecuador. Its natural habitat is subtropical or tropical moist montane forests. It is threatened by habitat loss.
