= Solanum luteoalbum =

Scientific classification
- Kingdom: Plantae
- Clade: Tracheophytes
- Clade: Angiosperms
- Clade: Eudicots
- Clade: Asterids
- Order: Solanales
- Family: Solanaceae
- Genus: Solanum
- Species: S. luteoalbum

Binomial name
- Solanum luteoalbum Pers.

Synonyms
- See text

Species of flowering plant

Solanum luteoalbum is a species of plant in the family Solanaceae.

Solanum semicoalitum as described by Bitter is an invalid name for this plant that is sometimes still seen. Altogether, the following synonyms are assigned to this species:

- Cyphomandra luteoalba (Pers.) A.Child
- Cyphomandra luteoalbum (Pers.) A.Child ex Bohs
- Solanum luteoalbum var. tunya J.F.Macbr.
- Solanum pubescens Ruiz & Pav. (non Willd.: preoccupied)

S. pubescens Roxb. is a nomen nudum. S. pubescens B.Heyne ex Walp. is S. violaceum Ortega.

- Solanum semicoalitum Bitter

The puzzling S. semicoalitum was classified as Critically Endangered endemic of Ecuador by the IUCN, before it was synonymized with the more widespread S. luteoalbum.

== Footnotes ==
- Montúfar, R.; Pitman, N. (2004). "Solanum semicoalitum". IUCN Red List of Threatened Species. 2004 e.T46343A11050176. doi:10.2305/IUCN.UK.2004.RLTS.T46343A11050176.en.
- Solanaceae Source (2004): Solanum luteoalbum. Version of May 2004. Retrieved 2008-SEP-30.
