= Myrcia neocambessedeana =

Conservation status
- Extinct (IUCN 2.3)

Scientific classification
- Kingdom: Plantae
- Clade: Tracheophytes
- Clade: Angiosperms
- Clade: Eudicots
- Clade: Rosids
- Order: Myrtales
- Family: Myrtaceae
- Genus: Myrcia
- Species: †M. neocambessedeana

Binomial name
- †Myrcia neocambessedeana E.Lucas & Sobral

Synonyms
- Gomidesia cambessedesiana O.Berg

Extinct species of flowering plant

Myrcia neocambessedeana (synonym Gomidesia cambessedesiana) was a species of plant in the family Myrtaceae. It was a shrub or tree endemic to Rio de Janeiro state in southeastern Brazil.
