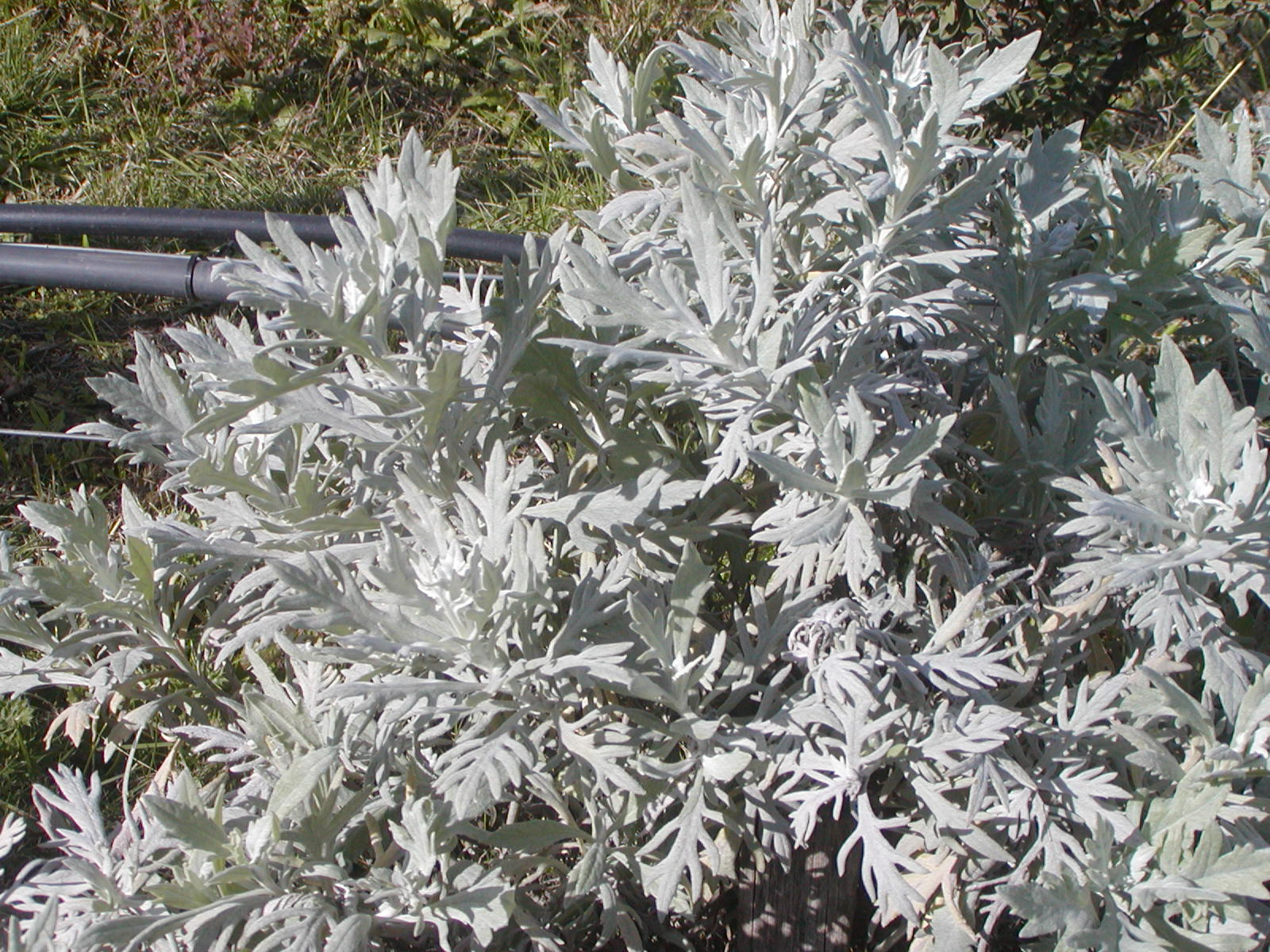

Conservation status
- Extinct in the Wild (IUCN 3.1)

Scientific classification
- Kingdom: Plantae
- Clade: Tracheophytes
- Clade: Angiosperms
- Clade: Eudicots
- Clade: Asterids
- Order: Asterales
- Family: Asteraceae
- Genus: Senecio
- Species: S. leucopeplus

Binomial name
- Senecio leucopeplus Cabrera, 1941

Synonyms
- Senecio candolleanus Hook. & Arn.

= Senecio leucopeplus =

Species of flowering plant

Senecio leucopeplus is a species of flowering plant in the family Asteraceae. It is native to northeastern Argentina. The species is currently extinct in the wild, as the last 2 specimens found in the wild disappeared in 2007. There are currently two specimens in cultivation at the Pillahuincó Botanic Garden.
