= Bulbophyllum erythroglossum =

Conservation status
- Critically endangered, possibly extinct (IUCN 3.1)

Scientific classification
- Kingdom: Plantae
- Clade: Embryophytes
- Clade: Tracheophytes
- Clade: Spermatophytes
- Clade: Angiosperms
- Clade: Monocots
- Order: Asparagales
- Family: Orchidaceae
- Subfamily: Epidendroideae
- Genus: Bulbophyllum
- Species: B. erythroglossum

Binomial name
- Bulbophyllum erythroglossum Bosser

Species of orchid

Bulbophyllum erythroglossum is a species of orchid in the genus Bulbophyllum. It is a pseudobulbous epiphyte endemic to east-northeastern Madagascar. It is critically endangered due to wood collecting and possibly illegal collection. It may be extinct.
