= Aechmea cymosopaniculata =

Conservation status
- Critically endangered, possibly extinct (IUCN 3.1)

Scientific classification
- Kingdom: Plantae
- Clade: Embryophytes
- Clade: Tracheophytes
- Clade: Spermatophytes
- Clade: Angiosperms
- Clade: Monocots
- Clade: Commelinids
- Order: Poales
- Family: Bromeliaceae
- Genus: Aechmea
- Subgenus: Aechmea subg. Aechmea
- Species: A. cymosopaniculata

Binomial name
- Aechmea cymosopaniculata Baker

Synonyms
- Aechmea paniculigera var. parviflora Griseb.

Species of flowering plant

Aechmea cymosopaniculata is a plant species in the genus Aechmea. This species is endemic to the Aragua region of Venezuela.
