= Melpomene brevipes =

Conservation status
- Critically endangered, possibly extinct (IUCN 3.1)

Scientific classification
- Kingdom: Plantae
- Clade: Tracheophytes
- Division: Polypodiophyta
- Class: Polypodiopsida
- Order: Polypodiales
- Suborder: Polypodiineae
- Family: Polypodiaceae
- Genus: Melpomene
- Species: M. brevipes

Binomial name
- Melpomene brevipes (C.V.Morton) A.R.Sm. & R.C.Moran

Species of fern

Melpomene brevipes is an extremely rare and possibly extinct species of fern in the family Polypodiaceae. It is endemic to Ecuador. Its natural habitat is subtropical or tropical moist montane forests. It is threatened by habitat loss. It is estimated that there are less than 5 ferns, if they still exist.
