= Pradosia mutisii =

Conservation status
- Extinct (IUCN 2.3)

Scientific classification
- Kingdom: Plantae
- Clade: Tracheophytes
- Clade: Angiosperms
- Clade: Eudicots
- Clade: Asterids
- Order: Ericales
- Family: Sapotaceae
- Genus: Pradosia
- Species: †P. mutisii

Binomial name
- †Pradosia mutisii Cronquist

Extinct species of flowering plant

Pradosia mutisii was a species of plant in the family Sapotaceae. It was endemic to Colombia.
