= Prestonia schumanniana =

Conservation status
- Critically endangered, possibly extinct (IUCN 3.1)

Scientific classification
- Kingdom: Plantae
- Clade: Tracheophytes
- Clade: Angiosperms
- Clade: Eudicots
- Clade: Asterids
- Order: Gentianales
- Family: Apocynaceae
- Genus: Prestonia
- Species: P. schumanniana

Binomial name
- Prestonia schumanniana Woodson

Species of plant

Prestonia schumanniana is a species of plant in the family Apocynaceae. It is endemic to Ecuador. Its natural habitat is subtropical or tropical dry forests. It is threatened by habitat loss.
