= Ctenitis pallatangana =

Conservation status
- Critically endangered, possibly extinct (IUCN 3.1)

Scientific classification
- Kingdom: Plantae
- Clade: Tracheophytes
- Division: Polypodiophyta
- Class: Polypodiopsida
- Order: Polypodiales
- Suborder: Polypodiineae
- Family: Dryopteridaceae
- Genus: Ctenitis
- Species: C. pallatangana

Binomial name
- Ctenitis pallatangana (Hook.) Ching

Species of fern

Ctenitis pallatangana is a species of fern. The only known collection was made more than a century ago, near Pallatanga in Chimborazo province, Ecuador, in high Andean forest above 1 500 m altitude. Lack of any further collections and widespread destruction of its habitat has resulted in it being listed by the IUCN as "Critically Endangered (Possibly Extinct)". The main threat to the species is believed to be habitat destruction by agricultural expansion.
