= Andropogon benthamianus =

Conservation status
- Critically endangered, possibly extinct (IUCN 3.1)

Scientific classification
- Kingdom: Plantae
- Clade: Tracheophytes
- Clade: Angiosperms
- Clade: Monocots
- Clade: Commelinids
- Order: Poales
- Family: Poaceae
- Subfamily: Panicoideae
- Genus: Andropogon
- Species: A. benthamianus

Binomial name
- Andropogon benthamianus Steud.

Species of grass

Andropogon benthamianus is a species of grass in the family Poaceae. It is found only in Ecuador, where it is known from only a single collection. It has been listed as critically endangered, and is feared extinct today.
