= Matelea ecuadorensis =

Conservation status
- Critically endangered, possibly extinct (IUCN 3.1)

Scientific classification
- Kingdom: Plantae
- Clade: Tracheophytes
- Clade: Angiosperms
- Clade: Eudicots
- Clade: Asterids
- Order: Gentianales
- Family: Apocynaceae
- Genus: Matelea
- Species: M. ecuadorensis

Binomial name
- Matelea ecuadorensis (Schltr.) Morillo

Synonyms
- Gonolobus ecuadorensis Schltr.

Species of plant

Matelea ecuadorensis is a species of plant in the family Apocynaceae. It is endemic to Ecuador. Its natural habitat is subtropical or tropical moist montane forests. It is threatened by habitat loss.

The species was first described as Gonolobus ecuadorensis by Rudolf Schlechter in 1906. In 1985 Gilberto N. Morillo placed the species in genus Matelea as M. ecuadorensis.
