= Flabellidium =

Conservation status
- Extinct (IUCN 3.1)

Scientific classification
- Kingdom: Plantae
- Division: Bryophyta
- Class: Bryopsida
- Subclass: Bryidae
- Order: Hypnales
- Family: Brachytheciaceae
- Genus: Flabellidium; Herzog
- Species: †F. spinosum

Binomial name
- †Flabellidium spinosum Herzog

Extinct genus of mosses

Flabellidium is an extinct genus of moss in the family Brachytheciaceae. It contains a single species, Flabellidium spinosum, also known as the Santa Cruz bryophyte.

== Distribution ==
The genus was endemic to the Santa Cruz cordillera of Bolivia. It occurred at 1,400 m. The species was apparently epiphytic and grew in montane forests.

== Extinction ==
The IUCN listed this species as extinct in 2002.

"This species was collected in 1911 and described in 1916. The forest at the type locality and in the vicinity has been logged and cultivated over the years. We therefore consider that there is no reasonable doubt that the only locality for this species has been destroyed and that the last individual has died."
