= Eugenia albida =

Conservation status
- Data Deficient (IUCN 3.1)

Scientific classification
- Kingdom: Plantae
- Clade: Tracheophytes
- Clade: Angiosperms
- Clade: Eudicots
- Clade: Rosids
- Order: Myrtales
- Family: Myrtaceae
- Genus: Eugenia
- Species: E. albida

Binomial name
- Eugenia albida Bonpl.

Synonyms
- Myrtus albida (Bonpl.) Kunth; Eugenia dysantha Benth.

Species of flowering plant

Eugenia albida is a species of flowering plant in the family Myrtaceae. It is a shrub native to Colombia, Ecuador and Venezuela.
