= Eugenia guayaquilensis =

Conservation status
- Critically endangered, possibly extinct (IUCN 3.1)

Scientific classification
- Kingdom: Plantae
- Clade: Tracheophytes
- Clade: Angiosperms
- Clade: Eudicots
- Clade: Rosids
- Order: Myrtales
- Family: Myrtaceae
- Genus: Eugenia
- Species: E. guayaquilensis

Binomial name
- Eugenia guayaquilensis (Kunth) DC.

Synonyms
- Emurtia guayaquilensis (Kunth) Raf.; Eugenia guayaquilensis var. genuina O.Berg; Eugenia guayaquilensis var. glabrior Benth. ex O.Berg; Myrtus guayaquilensis Kunth

Species of flowering plant

Eugenia guayaquilensis is a species of flowering plant in the family Myrtaceae. It is a shrub or tree endemic to Ecuador.
