= Philodendron balaoanum =

Conservation status
- Critically endangered, possibly extinct (IUCN 3.1)

Scientific classification
- Kingdom: Plantae
- Clade: Tracheophytes
- Clade: Angiosperms
- Clade: Monocots
- Order: Alismatales
- Family: Araceae
- Genus: Philodendron
- Species: P. balaoanum

Binomial name
- Philodendron balaoanum Engl.

Species of flowering plant

Philodendron balaoanum is a species of plant in the family Araceae. It is endemic to Ecuador. It is considered critically endangered and possibly extinct.

== See also ==
- List of Philodendron species
