= Senega quitensis =

Conservation status
- Critically endangered, possibly extinct (IUCN 3.1)

Scientific classification
- Kingdom: Plantae
- Clade: Embryophytes
- Clade: Tracheophytes
- Clade: Spermatophytes
- Clade: Angiosperms
- Clade: Eudicots
- Clade: Rosids
- Order: Fabales
- Family: Polygalaceae
- Genus: Senega
- Species: S. quitensis

Binomial name
- Senega quitensis (Turcz.) J.F.B.Pastore

Synonyms
- Polygala quitensis Turcz.; Polygala berlandieri var. bogotensis Chodat

Species of flowering plant

Senega quitensis is a species of plant in the family Polygalaceae. It is endemic to Ecuador. It was last seen in 1854 and may be extinct.
