= Campomanesia lundiana =

Conservation status
- Extinct (IUCN 2.3)

Scientific classification
- Kingdom: Plantae
- Clade: Tracheophytes
- Clade: Angiosperms
- Clade: Eudicots
- Clade: Rosids
- Order: Myrtales
- Family: Myrtaceae
- Genus: Campomanesia
- Species: †C. lundiana

Binomial name
- †Campomanesia lundiana (Kiaerskou) Mattos

Extinct species of flowering plant

Campomanesia lundiana, also known as the Rio de Janeiro myrtle, was a species of plant in the family Myrtaceae. Before modern extinction, the plant was endemic to Rio de Janeiro state, within the Atlantic Forest ecoregion in southeastern Brazil.
