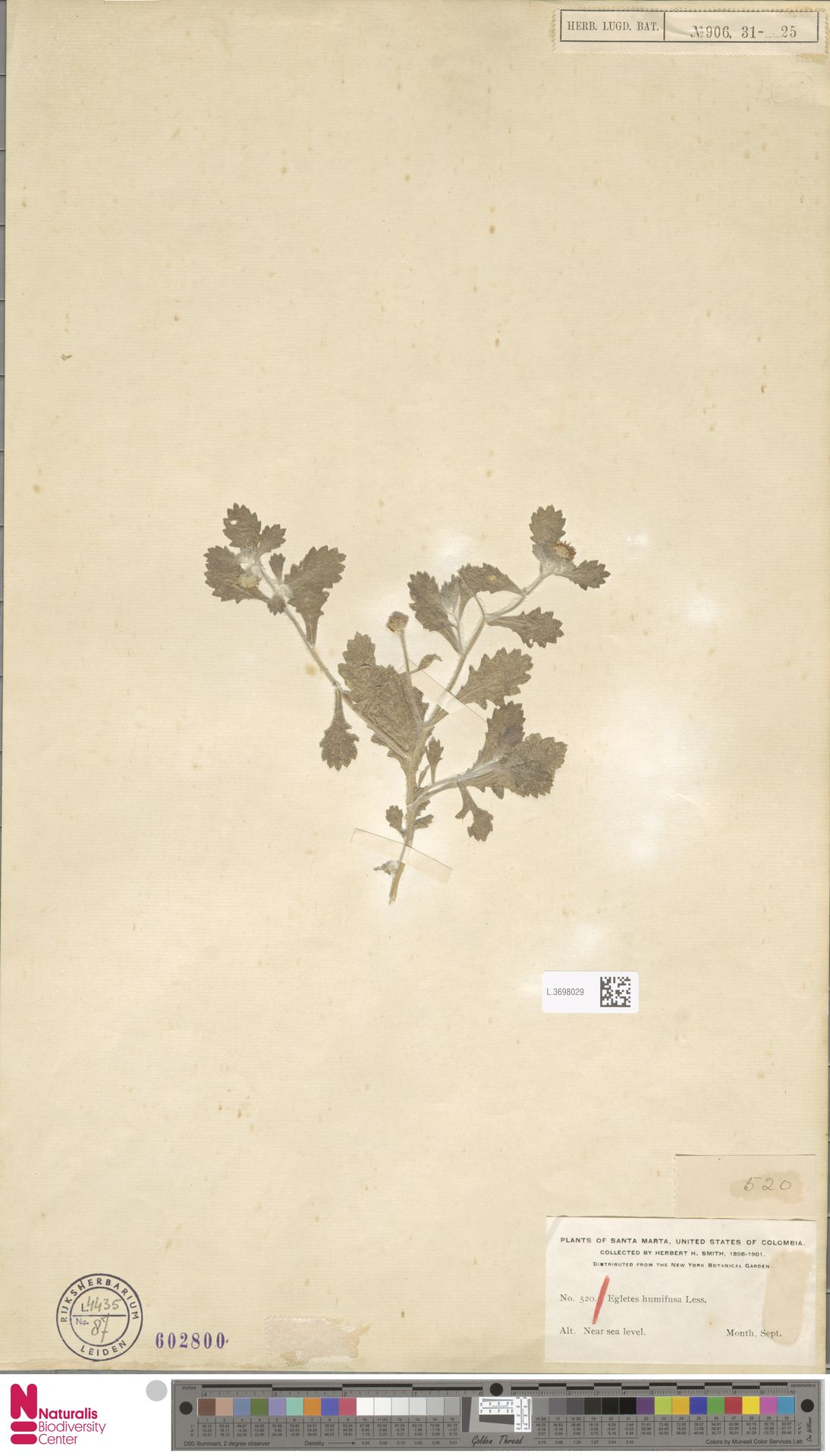

Conservation status
- Critically endangered, possibly extinct (IUCN 3.1)

Scientific classification
- Kingdom: Plantae
- Clade: Tracheophytes
- Clade: Angiosperms
- Clade: Eudicots
- Clade: Asterids
- Order: Asterales
- Family: Asteraceae
- Genus: Egletes
- Species: E. humifusa

Binomial name
- Egletes humifusa Less.

Synonyms
- Cotula humifusa (Less.) Willd. ex Steud.

= Egletes humifusa =

Species of flowering plant

Egletes humifusa is a species of flowering plant in the family Asteraceae. It is found only in Ecuador, where its natural habitat is subtropical or tropical dry forests. It is threatened by habitat loss.
