= Manettia holwayi =

Conservation status
- Critically endangered, possibly extinct (IUCN 3.1)

Scientific classification
- Kingdom: Plantae
- Clade: Tracheophytes
- Clade: Angiosperms
- Clade: Eudicots
- Clade: Asterids
- Order: Gentianales
- Family: Rubiaceae
- Genus: Manettia
- Species: M. holwayi

Binomial name
- Manettia holwayi Standl.

Species of plant

Manettia holwayi is a species of plant in the family Rubiaceae. It is endemic to Ecuador.
