= Magnolia wolfii =

Conservation status
- Critically endangered, possibly extinct in the wild (IUCN 3.1)

Scientific classification
- Kingdom: Plantae
- Clade: Tracheophytes
- Clade: Angiosperms
- Clade: Magnoliids
- Order: Magnoliales
- Family: Magnoliaceae
- Genus: Magnolia
- Section: Magnolia sect. Talauma
- Species: M. wolfii

Binomial name
- Magnolia wolfii (Lozano) Govaerts

Synonyms
- Talauma wolfii Lozano (basionym)

Species of tree

Magnolia wolfii is a tree species in the family Magnoliaceae. It is endemic to Colombia. The species is recorded only from one locality in Risaralda Department. The species is being investigated by a conservation and propagation research program implemented by the Technological University of Pereira, with the support of Botanic Gardens Conservation International.

In August 2006 scientists visited the small two hectare patch of forest where M. wolfii was known to grow. They found the area to be girded on all sides by plantations of coffee, and only three adult trees growing there, apparently bearing flowers and fruits, but no saplings.
