= Elaphandra retroflexa =

Conservation status
- Critically endangered, possibly extinct (IUCN 3.1)

Scientific classification
- Kingdom: Plantae
- Clade: Tracheophytes
- Clade: Angiosperms
- Clade: Eudicots
- Clade: Asterids
- Order: Asterales
- Family: Asteraceae
- Tribe: Heliantheae
- Genus: Elaphandra
- Species: E. retroflexa

Binomial name
- Elaphandra retroflexa (S.F.Blake) H.Rob.

Synonyms
- Aspilia retroflexa S.F.Blake; Wedelia retroflexa (S.F.Blake) B.L.Turner

Species of flowering plant

Elaphandra retroflexa is a species of flowering plant in the family Asteraceae. It is found only in Ecuador. Its natural habitat is subtropical or tropical dry forests. It is threatened by habitat loss.
