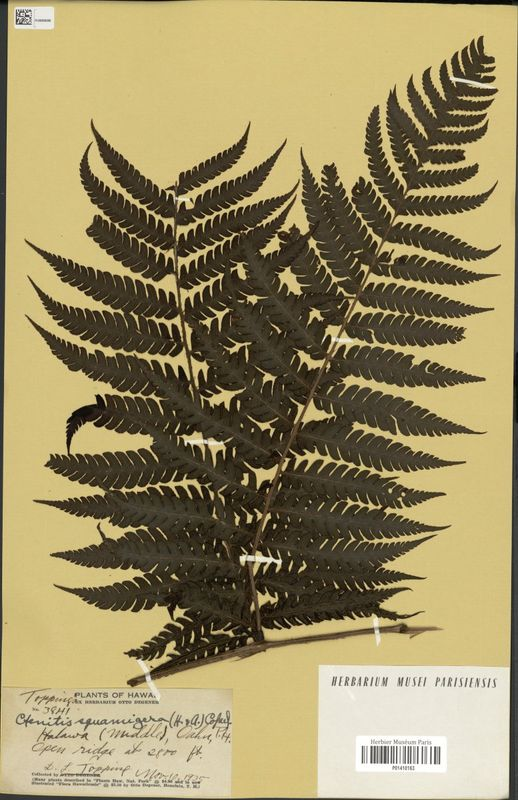

Conservation status
- Critically Endangered (IUCN 3.1)

Scientific classification
- Kingdom: Plantae
- Clade: Embryophytes
- Clade: Tracheophytes
- Division: Polypodiophyta
- Class: Polypodiopsida
- Order: Polypodiales
- Suborder: Polypodiineae
- Family: Dryopteridaceae
- Genus: Ctenitis
- Species: C. squamigera

Binomial name
- Ctenitis squamigera (Brack.) Copel.

= Ctenitis squamigera =

Species of fern

Ctenitis squamigera, commonly known as the Pacific lacefern or pauoa, is a critically endangered species of fern found only on the islands of Hawaii. In 2003 there were at least 183 individuals remaining, divided among 23 populations. Several populations consist of only one to four plants.

Threats to the species include the degradation of the Hawaiian forests by Axis deer, Mouflon sheep, feral pigs and goats, and invasive plant species such as Santa Barbara daisy and guava.

This fern is a federally listed endangered species of the United States.
