= List of Diplazium species =

Diplazium is a genus of ferns distributed on all continents except Antarctica. As of October 2026, the Checklist of Ferns and Lycophytes of the World recognized 469 species and 22 hybrids:

== A-D ==
- Diplazium aberrans Maxon & C.V.Morton
- Diplazium acanthopus C.Chr.
- Diplazium aculeatum Alderw.
- Diplazium adnatum Mynssen & Sylvestre
- Diplazium aemulum Underw. & Maxon
- Diplazium aequibasale (Baker) C.Chr.
- Diplazium albidosquamatum Alderw.
- Diplazium alienum (Mett.) Hieron.
- Diplazium altissimum (Jenman) C.Chr.
- Diplazium ambiguum Raddi
- Diplazium andapense (Tardieu) Rakotondr.
- Diplazium andinum (Pacheco & R.C.Moran) M.Kessler & A.R.Sm.
- Diplazium angulosum C.Chr.
- Diplazium angustatum Amann
- Diplazium angustipinna (Holttum) Holttum
- Diplazium angustisquamatum (Holttum) Parris
- Diplazium antioquiense A.Rojas
- Diplazium apatelium Alderw.
- Diplazium aphanoneuron Ohwi
- Diplazium apollinaris L'Herm. ex Fée
- Diplazium arayae A.Rojas
- Diplazium arborescens (Bory) Sw.
- Diplazium armatum (Copel.) Holttum
- Diplazium arnottii Brack.
- Diplazium asperulum Alderw.
- Diplazium assimile (Endl.) Bedd.
- Diplazium asterothrix C.Chr.
- Diplazium atirrense (Donn.Sm.) Lellinger
- Diplazium atratum Christ
- Diplazium atropurpureum Rosenst.
- Diplazium atrosquamosum (Copel.) C.Chr.
- Diplazium australe (R.Br.) Wakef.
- Diplazium avitaguense Hieron.
- Diplazium baishanzuense (Ching & P.S.Chiu ex W.M.Chu & Z.R.He) Z.R.He
- Diplazium banglum Fraser-Jenk. & Pasha
- Diplazium bantamense Blume
- Diplazium barbatum C.Chr.
- Diplazium barisanicum (Baker) C.Chr.
- Diplazium beddomei C.Chr.
- Diplazium bellum (C.B.Clarke) Bir
- Diplazium betimusense Alderw.
- Diplazium bicolor Stolze
- Diplazium biolleyi Christ
- Diplazium bipinnatum M.Kessler & A.R.Sm.
- Diplazium birgeri C.Chr.
- Diplazium bogotense (H.Karst.) Hieron.
- Diplazium bolivianum M.Kessler & A.R.Sm.
- Diplazium bolsteri Copel.
- Diplazium bombonasae Rosenst.
- Diplazium bostockii D.L.Jones
- Diplazium bouffordii Fraser-Jenk. & Pariyar
- Diplazium brachycarpum Mynssen & Sylvestre
- Diplazium brachylobum (Sledge) Manickam & Irudayaraj
- Diplazium brachysoroides Copel.
- Diplazium brausei Rosenst.
- Diplazium brevipes (Baker) C.Chr.
- Diplazium brooksii (Copel.) C.Chr.
- Diplazium buchtienii Rosenst.
- Diplazium bulbiferum Brack.
- Diplazium burmanicum Ching ex W.M.Chu & Z.R.He
- Diplazium calliphyllum (Copel.) M.G.Price
- Diplazium calogrammoides (Ching ex W.M.Chu & Z.R.He) Z.R.He
- Diplazium caracasanum (Willd.) Kunze ex T.Moore
- Diplazium cardiomorphum Alderw.
- Diplazium carnosum Christ
- Diplazium caudatum (Cav.) Jermy
- Diplazium celtidifolium Kunze
- Diplazium centripetale (Baker) Maxon
- Diplazium ceramicum (Miq.) C.Chr.
- Diplazium ceratolepis (Christ) Christ
- Diplazium changjiangense Z.R.He
- Diplazium chattagramicum (C.B.Clarke) Ching
- Diplazium chimboanum (Sodiro) C.Chr.
- Diplazium chimborazense (Spruce) Christ
- Diplazium chimuense C.D.Adams
- Diplazium chinense (Baker) C.Chr.
- Diplazium chioui T.C.Hsu
- Diplazium chiriquense C.D.Adams
- Diplazium chirripoense A.Rojas
- Diplazium chocoense (Triana) Hieron.
- Diplazium christii C.Chr.
- Diplazium ciliatum M.G.Price
- Diplazium clivicola H.J.Wei & Z.Y.Zuo
- Diplazium cominsii (Baker) C.Chr.
- Diplazium condorense Pacheco & A.R.Sm.
- Diplazium consacense Hieron.
- Diplazium conterminum Christ
- Diplazium corderoi (Sodiro) Diels
- Diplazium cordifolium Blume
- Diplazium cornutum A.Rojas
- Diplazium costale (Sw.) C.Presl
- Diplazium costulisorum (Copel.) C.Chr.
- Diplazium crassirhizoma A.Rojas
- Diplazium crassiusculum Ching
- Diplazium crenauritum Fraser-Jenk.
- Diplazium crinitum (Baker) C.Chr.
- Diplazium cristatum (Desr.) Alston
- Diplazium cristovalense (Baker) C.W.Chen
- Diplazium croatianum C.D.Adams
- Diplazium cultratum C.Presl
- Diplazium cultrifolium (L.) Kunze
- Diplazium cumingii (C.Presl) C.Chr.
- Diplazium cuneifolium Rosenst.
- Diplazium curtisii (Holttum) Holttum
- Diplazium cyamudongoense Eb.Fisch. & Lobin
- Diplazium cyatheifolium (Rich.) C.Presl
- Diplazium dameriae Pic.Serm.
- Diplazium davaoense Copel.
- Diplazium deciduum N.Ohta & M.Takamiya
- Diplazium decompositum (Copel.) Parris
- Diplazium decurrens Bedd.
- Diplazium deltoideum (C.Presl) C.Presl
- Diplazium dielsii (Brause) Holttum
- Diplazium dietrichianum (Luerss.) C.Chr.
- Diplazium dilatatum Blume
- Diplazium dinghushanicum (Ching & S.H.Wu) Z.R.He
- Diplazium diplazioides (Klotzsch & H.Karst.) Alston
- Diplazium divergens Rosenst.
- Diplazium divisissimum (Baker) Christ
- Diplazium doederleinii (Luerss.) Makino
- Diplazium donnell-smithii Christ
- Diplazium drepanolobium A.R.Sm.
- Diplazium dulongjiangense (W.M.Chu) Z.R.He
- Diplazium dushanense (Ching ex W.M.Chu & Z.R.He) R.Wei & X.C.Zhang

== E-M ==
- Diplazium echinatum C.Chr.
- Diplazium egenolfioides M.G.Price
- Diplazium ellipticum (Copel.) C.Chr.
- Diplazium errans Lorea-Hern. & A.R.Sm.
- Diplazium esculentoides M.Kato
- Diplazium esculentum (Retz.) Sw.
- Diplazium exindusiatum M.Kessler & A.R.Sm.
- Diplazium expansum Willd.
- Diplazium fadyenii (Hook.) Proctor
- Diplazium falcinellum C.Chr.
- Diplazium fauriei Christ
- Diplazium ferulaceum (T.Moore ex Hook.) Lellinger
- Diplazium filamentosum (Roxb.) Cronk
- Diplazium fimbriatum Mynssen & F.B.Matos
- Diplazium flexuosum (C.Presl) C.Presl
- Diplazium florensiae (Rakotondr.) Rouhan & L.Y.Kuo
- Diplazium forbesii (Baker) C.Chr.
- Diplazium fosbergii (Copel.) C.V.Morton
- Diplazium franconis Liebm.
- Diplazium fraxinifolium C.Presl
- Diplazium fructuosum Copel.
- Diplazium fuenzalidae Espinosa
- Diplazium fuertesii Brause
- Diplazium fuliginosum (Hook.) M.G.Price
- Diplazium furculicolum Alderw.
- Diplazium geophilum (Copel.) Alderw.
- Diplazium gillespiei (Copel.) M.Kato
- Diplazium godmanii (Baker) C.Chr.
- Diplazium gomezianum C.D.Adams
- Diplazium gracilescens (Mett.) T.Moore ex R.Knuth
- Diplazium grandifolium (Sw.) Sw.
- Diplazium grantii (Copel.) C.Chr.
- Diplazium grashoffii Rosenst.
- Diplazium griffithii (T.Moore) Diels
- Diplazium hachijoense Nakai
- Diplazium hainanense Ching
- Diplazium hammelianum C.D.Adams
- Diplazium harpeodes T.Moore
- Diplazium hayatamae N.Ohta & M.Takamiya
- Diplazium hellwigii Mickel & Beitel
- Diplazium herbaceum Fée
- Diplazium heterocarpum Ching
- Diplazium hewittii (Copel.) C.Chr.
- Diplazium hians Kunze ex Klotzsch
- Diplazium hieronymi (Sodiro) C.Chr.
- Diplazium himalayense (Ching) Panigrahi
- Diplazium hirtipes Christ
- Diplazium hirtisquama (Ching & W.M.Chu) Z.R.He
- Diplazium holttumii Hovenkamp
- Diplazium hottae Tagawa
- Diplazium humbertii (C.Chr.) Pic.Serm.
- Diplazium huttonii (Baker) C.Chr.
- Diplazium hyalinum A.Rojas
- Diplazium hymenodes (Mett.) Á.Löve & D.Löve
- Diplazium immensum Stolze
- Diplazium incomptum Tagawa
- Diplazium ingens Christ
- Diplazium insigne Holttum
- Diplazium integrifolium Blume
- Diplazium irigense (Copel.) M.G.Price
- Diplazium jinfoshanicola (W.M.Chu) Z.R.He
- Diplazium jinpingense (W.M.Chu) Z.R.He
- Diplazium kansuense (Ching & Y.P.Hsu) Z.R.He
- Diplazium kappanense Hayata
- Diplazium kawakamii Hayata
- Diplazium ketagalaniorum T.C.Hsu
- Diplazium khullarii Fraser-Jenk.
- Diplazium kunstleri Holttum
- Diplazium kuoi T.C.Hsu
- Diplazium laevipes C.Chr.
- Diplazium laffanianum (Baker) C.Chr.
- Diplazium lanceolatum A.Rojas
- Diplazium latifolium T.Moore
- Diplazium latilobum (Copel.) Parris
- Diplazium latipinnulum (Ching & W.M.Chu) Z.R.He
- Diplazium latisectum Rosend.
- Diplazium latisquamatum Holttum
- Diplazium laxifrons Rosenst.
- Diplazium legalloi Proctor
- Diplazium lellingeri Pacheco
- Diplazium leptocarpon Fée
- Diplazium leptogrammoides C.Chr.
- Diplazium leptophyllum (Baker) Christ
- Diplazium lherminieri Fée
- Diplazium lilloi (Hicken) R.M.Tryon & A.F.Tryon
- Diplazium lindbergii (Mett.) Christ
- Diplazium lineolatum Blume
- Diplazium lobatum (Tagawa) Tagawa
- Diplazium lobbianum (Hook.) T.Moore
- Diplazium lomariaceum (Christ) M.G.Price
- Diplazium lonchophyllum Kunze
- Diplazium longicarpum Kodama
- Diplazium longifolium D.Don ex T.Moore
- Diplazium longipes Fée
- Diplazium lustrosum A.Rojas
- Diplazium macrodictyon (Baker) Diels
- Diplazium macrophyllum Desv.
- Diplazium magnificum (Copel.) M.G.Price
- Diplazium mamberamense Alderw.
- Diplazium manickamii Fraser-Jenk. & Kholia
- Diplazium maonense Ching
- Diplazium mapiriense Rosenst.
- Diplazium marojejyense (Tardieu) J.P.Roux
- Diplazium matamense A.Rojas
- Diplazium matangense C.Chr.
- Diplazium mattogrossense Samp.
- Diplazium maximum (D.Don) C.Chr.
- Diplazium medogense (Ching & S.K.Wu) Fraser-Jenk.
- Diplazium megaphyllum (Baker) Christ
- Diplazium megistophyllum (Copel.) Tagawa
- Diplazium melanocaulon Brack.
- Diplazium melanochlamys (Hook.) T.Moore
- Diplazium melanolepis Alderw.
- Diplazium melanopodium Fée
- Diplazium melanosorum (Sodiro) C.Chr.
- Diplazium mesocarpum Alderw.
- Diplazium metcalfii Ching
- Diplazium mettenianum (Miq.) C.Chr.
- Diplazium mickelii Mynssen & Sylvestre
- Diplazium microphyllum Desv.
- Diplazium mildei (Kuhn) C.Chr.
- Diplazium mixtum (Roxb.) C.V.Morton
- Diplazium moccennianum (Sodiro) C.Chr.
- Diplazium mollifrons (C.Chr.) M.G.Price
- Diplazium molokaiense W.J.Rob.
- Diplazium moluccanum Rosenst.
- Diplazium montediabloense Proctor
- Diplazium moranii C.D.Adams
- Diplazium moritzianum Stolze
- Diplazium morogorense J.P.Roux
- Diplazium moultonii (Copel.) Tagawa
- Diplazium multigemmatum Lellinger
- Diplazium muricatum (Mett.) Alderw.
- Diplazium murkele Hovenkamp
- Diplazium mutabile Hovenkamp
- Diplazium mutilum Kunze
- Diplazium myriomerum (Christ) Lellinger

== N-R ==
- Diplazium nagalandicum Fraser-Jenk., Odyuo & D.K.Roy
- Diplazium nanchuanicum (W.M.Chu) R.Wei & X.C.Zhang
- Diplazium navarrense Lellinger
- Diplazium navarretei Stolze
- Diplazium neglectum (H.Karst.) C.Chr.
- Diplazium nelsonianum A.Rojas
- Diplazium nemorale (Baker) Schelpe
- Diplazium nervosum (Mett.) Diels
- Diplazium nicotianifolium (Mett.) C.Chr.
- Diplazium nigrosquamosum (Ching ex W.M.Chu & Z.R.He) Z.R.He
- Diplazium nipponicum Tagawa
- Diplazium nitens Rosenst.
- Diplazium novoguineense (Rosenst.) Hieron.
- Diplazium nymanii Hieron.
- Diplazium oblongifolium (Hook.) Jermy
- Diplazium obscurum Christ
- Diplazium oellgaardii Stolze
- Diplazium okinawaense Tagawa
- Diplazium okudairae Makino
- Diplazium oligosorum Copel.
- Diplazium ordinatum (Christ) Lellinger
- Diplazium oreophilum Underw. & Maxon
- Diplazium ottonis Klotzsch
- Diplazium ovatum (W.M.Chu ex Ching & Z.Y.Liu) R.Wei & X.C.Zhang
- Diplazium pactile Lellinger
- Diplazium palaviense Stolze
- Diplazium pallidum (Blume) T.Moore
- Diplazium palmense Rosenst.
- Diplazium panamense C.D.Adams
- Diplazium paradoxum Fée
- Diplazium paucijugum Stolze
- Diplazium paucipinnum Stolze
- Diplazium pectinatum (Fée) C.Chr.
- Diplazium pedatum Klotzsch
- Diplazium pedicellatum (Copel.) Parris
- Diplazium permirabile Alderw.
- Diplazium perrotetii (Tardieu) Tagawa
- Diplazium peruvianum Mynssen & Sylvestre
- Diplazium petiolare C.Presl
- Diplazium petiolulatum (Stolze) A.R.Sm.
- Diplazium petri Tardieu
- Diplazium phuntshoi Fraser-Jenk.
- Diplazium pinatubicum M.G.Price
- Diplazium pinfaense Ching
- Diplazium pinnatifidopinnatum (Hook.) T.Moore
- Diplazium pinnatifidum Kunze
- Diplazium plantaginifolium (L.) Urb.
- Diplazium platychlamys C.Chr.
- Diplazium poiense C.Chr.
- Diplazium polycarpum (Copel.) C.Chr.
- Diplazium polypodioides Blume
- Diplazium ponapense (Copel.) Hosok.
- Diplazium popayanense Hieron.
- Diplazium porphyrorachis (Baker) Diels
- Diplazium portugesense A.Rojas
- Diplazium prionophyllum Kunze
- Diplazium procumbens Holttum
- Diplazium proliferum (Lam.) Thouars
- Diplazium prolongatum Rosenst.
- Diplazium prominulum Maxon
- Diplazium propinquum (Copel.) Alderw.
- Diplazium protensum Rosenst.
- Diplazium pseudocarnosum A.Rojas
- Diplazium pseudocyatheifolium Rosenst.
- Diplazium pseudodoederleinii Hayata
- Diplazium pseudoporrectum Hieron.
- Diplazium pseudosetigerum (Christ) Fraser-Jenk.
- Diplazium pseudoshepherdioides Hieron.
- Diplazium pseudosylvaticum Panigrahi
- Diplazium puberulentum Mickel & Beitel
- Diplazium pulicosum (Hook.) T.Moore
- Diplazium pullingeri (Baker) J.Sm.
- Diplazium quadrangulatum (W.M.Chu) Z.R.He
- Diplazium queenslandicum Tindale
- Diplazium rapense E.D.Br.
- Diplazium repandum Blume
- Diplazium rhoifolium Kuntze
- Diplazium ribae (Pacheco & R.C.Moran) Lellinger
- Diplazium riedelianum (Bong. ex Kuhn) Kuhn ex C.Chr.
- Diplazium riparium Holttum
- Diplazium rivale (Spruce) Diels
- Diplazium robustum (Sodiro) A.Rojas
- Diplazium rodriguezii A.Rojas
- Diplazium roemerianum (Kunze) C.Presl
- Diplazium roraimense Cremers & K.U.Kramer
- Diplazium rosenstockii (Copel.) Brownlie
- Diplazium rostratum Fée
- Diplazium rubricaule C.Chr.

== S-Z ==
- Diplazium salazarianum A.Rojas
- Diplazium sammatii (Kuhn & Decken) C.Chr.
- Diplazium sanctae-rosae Christ
- Diplazium sancti-johannis (Copel.) C.V.Morton
- Diplazium sanderi (C.Chr.) Pacheco
- Diplazium sandwichianum (C.Presl) Diels
- Diplazium santanderense A.Rojas
- Diplazium schkuhrii J.Sm.
- Diplazium schlechteri Hieron.
- Diplazium schraderi Hieron.
- Diplazium schultzei Hieron.
- Diplazium scotinum Rosenst.
- Diplazium seemannii T.Moore
- Diplazium serratifolium Ching
- Diplazium shepherdioides (Baker) C.Chr.
- Diplazium siamense C.Chr.
- Diplazium sibiricum (Turcz. ex Kunze) Sa.Kurata
- Diplazium sibuyanense (Copel.) Alderw.
- Diplazium sikkimense (C.B.Clarke) C.Chr.
- Diplazium silvestre Alderw.
- Diplazium simile (W.M.Chu) R.Wei & X.C.Zhang
- Diplazium simplicivenium Holttum
- Diplazium skutchii Lellinger
- Diplazium sodiroanum C.Chr.
- Diplazium solandri Carruth.
- Diplazium solutum (Christ) Lellinger
- Diplazium sorzogonense (C.Presl) C.Presl
- Diplazium speciosum Blume
- Diplazium spectabile (Wall. ex Mett.) Ching
- Diplazium spiniferum Alderw.
- Diplazium spinulosum Blume
- Diplazium splendens Ching
- Diplazium sprucei (Baker) C.Chr.
- Diplazium squamigerum (Mett.) Matsum.
- Diplazium squamuligerum (Rosenst.) Parris
- Diplazium squarrosum K.Iwats. & M.Kato
- Diplazium stellatopilosum (Brause) Holttum
- Diplazium stenocarpum (Mett.) C.Chr.
- Diplazium stenochlamys C.Chr.
- Diplazium stenolepis Ching
- Diplazium stipitipinnula Holttum
- Diplazium stokeyae Proctor
- Diplazium stoliczkae Bedd.
- Diplazium stolzei (Pacheco & R.C.Moran) R.Kr.Singh, V.K.Rawat & Sanjeet Kumar
- Diplazium striatastrum Lellinger
- Diplazium striatum (L.) C.Presl
- Diplazium stuebelianum (Hieron.) Stolze
- Diplazium stuebelii Hieron.
- Diplazium subalternisegmentum Praptosuwiryo
- Diplazium subdilatatum (Ching) Z.R.He
- Diplazium subintegrum Holttum
- Diplazium subobliquatum Rosenst.
- Diplazium subobtusum Rosenst.
- Diplazium subpolypodioides (Alderw.) Alderw.
- Diplazium subquadripinnatum (Copel.) Lellinger
- Diplazium subscabrum (Copel.) C.Chr.
- Diplazium subserratum (Blume) T.Moore
- Diplazium subsilvaticum Christ
- Diplazium subspectabile (Ching & W.M.Chu) R.Wei & X.C.Zhang
- Diplazium subtripinnatum Nakai
- Diplazium succulentum (C.B.Clarke) C.Chr.
- Diplazium supranitens C.Chr.
- Diplazium sylvaticum (Bory) Sw.
- Diplazium symmetricum (Copel.) M.G.Price
- Diplazium tabacinum Copel.
- Diplazium tabalosense Hieron.
- Diplazium tablazianum Christ
- Diplazium taiwanense Tagawa
- Diplazium takii Sa.Kurata
- Diplazium tamandarei Rosenst.
- Diplazium taquetii C.Chr.
- Diplazium taylorianum (Jenman) Maxon ex Proctor
- Diplazium tenuifolium (Copel.) Lellinger
- Diplazium ternatum Liebm.
- Diplazium thailandicum Pongkai, Boonkerd & Pollawatn
- Diplazium tibeticum (Ching & S.K.Wu) Z.R.He
- Diplazium tomentellum (Rosenst.) L.D.Gómez
- Diplazium tomentosum Blume
- Diplazium travancoricum Bedd.
- Diplazium trianae (Mett.) C.Chr.
- Diplazium tricholepis C.Chr.
- Diplazium truncatilobum C.Chr.
- Diplazium tungurahuae (Sodiro) C.Chr.
- Diplazium turgidum Rosenst.
- Diplazium turubalense Rosenst.
- Diplazium tutense C.D.Adams
- Diplazium ulugurense Verdc.
- Diplazium uncidens (Rosenst.) C.Chr.
- Diplazium unilobum (Poir.) Hieron.
- Diplazium urbani (Christ) C.Chr.
- Diplazium urticifolium Christ
- Diplazium vanvuureni Alderw.
- Diplazium vastum (Mett.) Diels
- Diplazium velaminosum (Diels) Pic.Serm.
- Diplazium velutinum Holttum
- Diplazium venulosum (Baker) Diels
- Diplazium verapax (Donn.Sm.) Hieron.
- Diplazium vesiculosum (Sodiro) C.Chr.
- Diplazium vestitum C.Presl
- Diplazium virescens Kunze
- Diplazium viridescens Ching
- Diplazium wahauense M.Kato, Darnaedi & K.Iwats.
- Diplazium walkeri Hovenkamp
- Diplazium wangii Ching
- Diplazium weinlandii Christ
- Diplazium welwitschii (Hook.) Diels
- Diplazium wendtii Mickel & A.R.Sm.
- Diplazium werckleanum Christ
- Diplazium wheeleri (Baker) Diels
- Diplazium whitfordii Copel.
- Diplazium wichurae (Mett.) Diels
- Diplazium williamsii Copel.
- Diplazium wilsonii (Baker) Diels
- Diplazium wolfii Hieron.
- Diplazium woodwardioides (C.Presl) Holttum
- Diplazium xiphophyllum (Baker) C.Chr.
- Diplazium yinchanianum Zi Y.Liu, H.J.Wei & Y.H.Yan
- Diplazium yuyoense M.Kessler & A.R.Sm.
- Diplazium zakamenense (Tardieu) Rakotondr.
- Diplazium zangnanense R.Wei & M.J.Lian
- Diplazium zanzibaricum (Baker) C.Chr.

== Hybrids ==
- Diplazium × bittyuense Tagawa
- Diplazium × hutohanum Sa.Kurata ex S.Seriz.
- Diplazium × hybridum W.H.Wagner & D.D.Palmer ined. provisionally
- Diplazium × kanayamaense K.Hori & H.Kanemitsu
- Diplazium × kashmirianum Fraser-Jenk.
- Diplazium × kawabatae Sa.Kurata
- Diplazium × kidoi Sa.Kurata
- Diplazium × neobirii Fraser-Jenk.
- Diplazium × okudairaioides Sa.Kurata
- Diplazium × owaseanum Sa.Kurata
- Diplazium × proliferoides Bory
- Diplazium × satsumense Sa.Kurata
- Diplazium × subternatum Testo, Sundue & A.Vasco
- Diplazium × takamiyae Fraser-Jenk.
- Diplazium × tertium-maximale Fraser-Jenk.
- Diplazium × tetsu-yamanakae Sa.Kurata
- Diplazium × toriianum Sa.Kurata
- Diplazium × torresianum Testo, Sundue & A.Vasco
- Diplazium × tsukushiense K.Hori & H.Kanemitsu
- Diplazium × wallichianum Fraser-Jenk.
- Diplazium × yakumontanum Tagawa
- Diplazium × yaoshanense (Y.C.Wu) Tardieu
