= Miroviaceae =

Miroviaceae Temporal range: Early Jurassic–Late Cretaceous

Scientific classification
- Kingdom: Plantae
- Division: Pinophyta
- Class: Pinopsida
- Order: Pinales
- Family: †Miroviaceae Bose & Manum, 1990

Type genus
- †Mirovia Reymanówna, 1985

Genera
- †Mirovia Reymanówna, 1985 (syn. Arctopitys Bose & Manum, 1990); †Sciadopityoides Sveshnikova; †Tritaenia Mägdefrau & Rudolph

Synonyms
- Arctopityaceae Bose & Manum, 1990

Extinct family of Mesozoic conifers

Miroviaceae is an extinct family of conifers known from fossil leaves of Mesozoic age. It was established by Mahendra N. Bose and Svein B. Manum in 1990 for a distinctive group of conifer leaves from the Early Cretaceous of the Arctic. The family was first published under the name Arctopityaceae, which the authors replaced with Miroviaceae before the work was released.

== Taxonomic history ==
Bose and Manum described the group in a 1990 monograph in the series Norsk Polarinstitutt Skrifter, re-evaluating fossil conifer leaves from Spitsbergen, Greenland and Baffin Island. They named the family Arctopityaceae, with the new genus Arctopitys as its type. While the work was in the final stage of printing, they realised that Arctopitys was a junior synonym of Mirovia, a genus that Maria Reymanówna had described in 1985 from the Jurassic of the Kraków region in Poland. In an addendum to the same work they corrected the nomenclature and introduced the name Miroviaceae to replace Arctopityaceae.

== Description ==
The family groups conifer leaves that share a stomatal arrangement like that of the living Japanese umbrella pine (Sciadopitys): the stomata are confined to a zone running along the middle of the leaf. As first set out in 1990, the group comprised four genera and twelve species from the Lower Cretaceous of Spitsbergen, West Greenland and Baffin Island, with further species known from Middle Jurassic to Upper Cretaceous rocks elsewhere.

== Genera ==
In a follow-up paper in 1991, Bose and Manum added the genus Tritaenia, based on its type species T. linkii from the Wealden of Germany, to the family. They also described Mirovia groenlandica as a new species, made the new combination Tritaenia crassa, and documented Sciadopityoides nathorstii, all from the Lower Cretaceous of West Greenland. Genera assigned to the family include:

- Mirovia Reymanówna, 1985 - the type genus (synonym Arctopitys Bose & Manum, 1990)
- Sciadopityoides Sveshnikova
- Tritaenia Mägdefrau & Rudolph

== Distribution ==
Most of the early-described material came from Arctic deposits, but members of the family have since been reported more widely. In 2008, Mirovia was recorded for the first time from the Early Jurassic and from Central Asia, with two new species, M. asiatica and M. kazachstanica, described from Mangyshlak in western Kazakhstan. Sciadopityoides has been documented from leaves collected in northern East Siberia, the Urals, Ukraine and Greenland.
