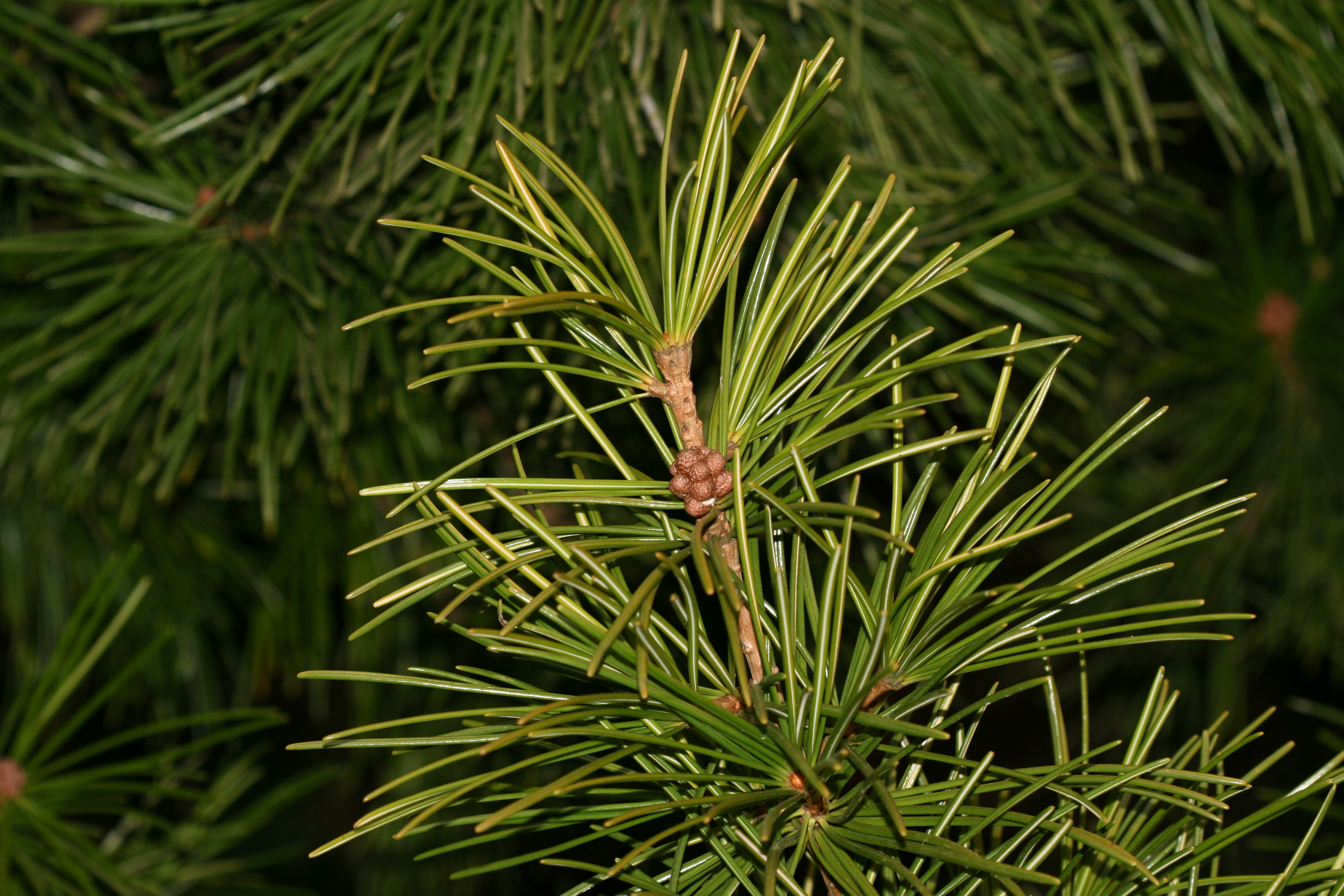
- Sciadopitys verticillata

Scientific classification
- Kingdom: Plantae
- Clade: Embryophytes
- Clade: Tracheophytes
- Clade: Gymnosperms
- Division: Pinophyta
- Class: Pinopsida
- Order: Cupressales
- Family: Sciadopityaceae; Luerss.

Genera
- Sciadopitys; †Sciadopitycutis; †Sciadopityoides; †Sciadopityostrobus; †Sciadopityspollenites; †Sciadopitytes; †Zhangoxylon; †Cerebropollenites

= Sciadopityaceae =

Sciadopityaceae Temporal range: Middle Jurassic–Recent

Umbrella pine family of conifers

Sciadopityaceae, the umbrella pine family, are a family of conifers now endemic to Japan, but in prehistoric times they could also be found in Europe and China. The sole living member of the family is Sciadopitys verticillata (the kōyamaki tree or umbrella pine), while several extinct genera are known from the fossil record. Wood suggested to belong to the family has been reported from the Jurassic of China, though the relationship of pre-Cretaceous fossils to Sciadopitys is ambiguous. Sciadopitys species are known from the Late Cretaceous of Japan before becoming widespread across Laurasia during most of the Cenozoic, especially in Europe until the Pliocene.
