= Sciadopityoides =

Sciadopityoides Temporal range: Middle Jurassic–Late Cretaceous

Scientific classification
- Kingdom: Plantae
- Division: Pinophyta
- Class: Pinopsida
- Order: Pinales
- Family: †Miroviaceae
- Genus: †Sciadopityoides Sveshnikova, 1981

Type species
- †Sciadopityoides uralensis (Dorofeev & Sveshnikova) Sveshnikova

Species
- See text

Extinct genus of Mesozoic conifers

Sciadopityoides is an extinct genus of conifers known from fossil leaves of Jurassic and Cretaceous age. It belongs to the extinct family Miroviaceae. Its leaves resemble those of the living Japanese umbrella pine (Sciadopitys) in having the stomata confined to a zone along the middle of the underside of the leaf.

== Taxonomy ==
Many Mesozoic leaves of this kind were first described under the living genus Sciadopitys or the fossil genus Sciadopitytes. In 1981 the palaeobotanist Sveshnikova rejected Sciadopitytes and erected Sciadopityoides as a new genus of uncertain position within the conifers for these leaves. The type species is S. uralensis, from Upper Cretaceous deposits of the Urals.

In 1987 Svein B. Manum reviewed the genus and emended its diagnosis. He accepted Sveshnikova's name but found that three of the fourteen species she had placed in it were invalidly published. Among the remaining eleven, he identified three closely related species as the core of the genus and regarded the rest as a more mixed assemblage. When Bose and Manum established the family Miroviaceae in 1990 (first published as Arctopityaceae), Sciadopityoides was one of its genera.

In 2015 Natalya Nosova and Anna Kiritchkova restudied leaves of the genus from northern East Siberia, the Urals, Ukraine and Greenland. They used scanning electron and confocal laser microscopy to examine the leaf surfaces, the first time these methods had been applied to the genus. They showed that Sciadopitys arctica Abramova (1984) is the same species as S. crameri and that Sciadopitys swetlanae Kiritchkova (1985) is the same as S. brevifolia. They also gave emended diagnoses of S. brevifolia and S. ukrainensis, and chose a lectotype for S. brevifolia because its holotype is missing.

== Description ==
The leaves are linear to oval, with a straight or slightly widened base and a blunt to tapering tip. A prominent groove runs along the middle of the underside of the leaf and contains the stomatal zone. The cuticle is thick, reaching 40–50 μm, and the leaf tissue contains resin ducts. The margins of the groove usually carry long, cylindrical papillae. The stomata are scattered or arranged in rows and vary in orientation. Within the Miroviaceae, Sciadopityoides is distinguished by the shape of its leaf base.

Although the stomatal arrangement recalls Sciadopitys, the overall structure of the fossil leaves differs significantly from that of the living genus.

== Species ==
Nosova and Kiritchkova (2015) recognised eight species:

Species	Age	Region
S. brevifolia (Abramova) Hvalj	Albian–Cenomanian	East Siberia
S. crameri (Heer) Sveshnikova	Albian; Albian–Cenomanian	West Greenland; East Siberia
S. ikorfatensis Bose & Manum	Albian	West Greenland
S. microphylla (Heer) Bose & Manum	Barremian–Albian	Arctic
S. nathorstii (Halle) Sveshnikova	Albian	West Greenland
S. ukrainensis (Doludenko) Sveshnikova	Bajocian–Bathonian	Ukraine
S. uralensis (Dorofeev & Sveshnikova) Sveshnikova (type species)	Cenomanian–Turonian	Urals
S. variabilis (Bose) Sveshnikova	Barremian–Aptian	Arctic Canada

== Distribution ==
Sciadopityoides is known only from the Northern Hemisphere. In 1987 Manum noted that Sciadopitys-like leaves were most diverse from the Late Jurassic to the Early Cretaceous and had been found only north of about 40°N. In 1991 Bose and Manum recorded S. nathorstii from several Lower Cretaceous localities in West Greenland, including Atanikerdluk, Kome and Slibestensfjeld. The oldest species recognised in 2015, S. ukrainensis, comes from Middle Jurassic (Bajocian–Bathonian) rocks of Ukraine, and the youngest, S. uralensis, from Late Cretaceous (Cenomanian–Turonian) rocks of the Urals.
