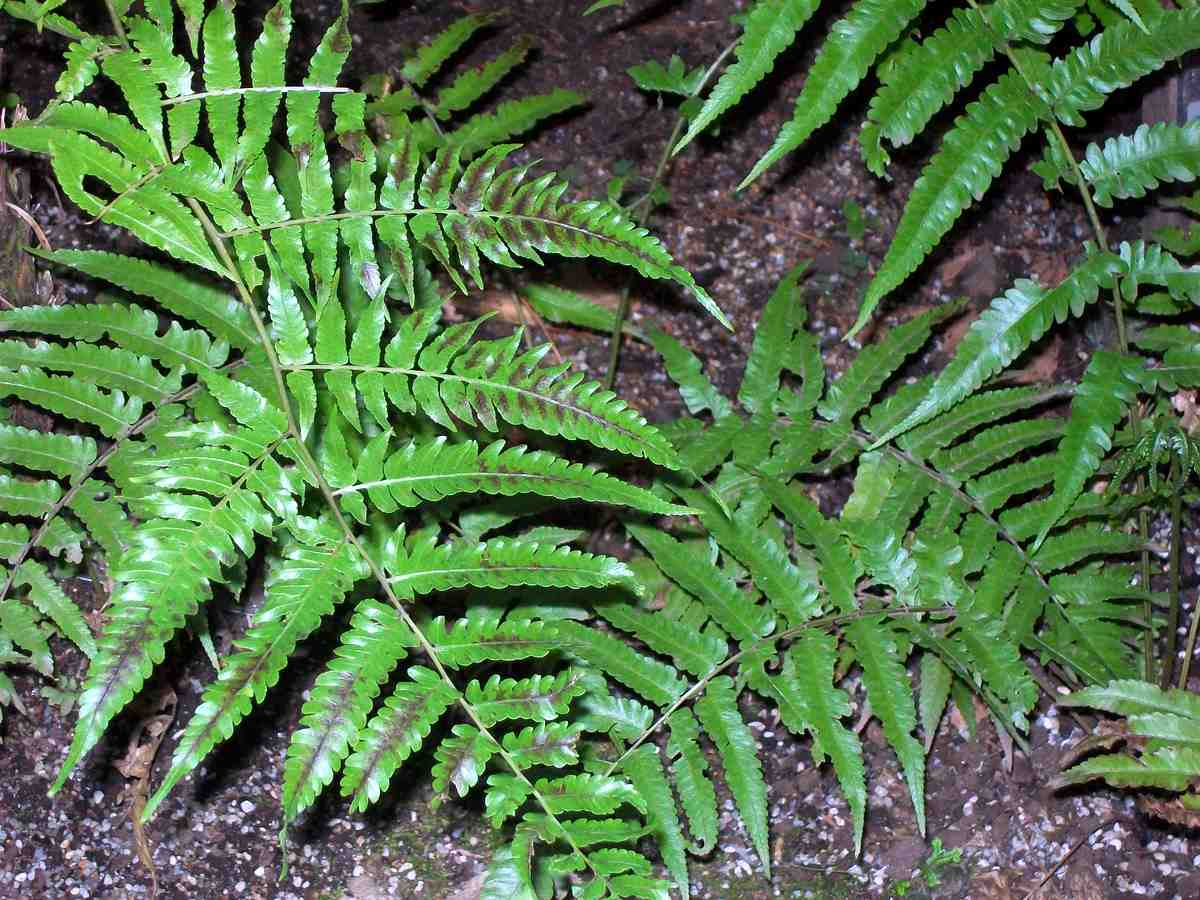
- Diplazium dietrichianum

Scientific classification
- Kingdom: Plantae
- Clade: Embryophytes
- Clade: Tracheophytes
- Division: Polypodiophyta
- Class: Polypodiopsida
- Order: Polypodiales
- Suborder: Aspleniineae
- Family: Athyriaceae
- Genus: Diplazium; Sw.

Species
- See List of Diplazium species

Synonyms
- 16 synonyms: Allantodia Wall.; Allantodia R.Br.; Anisogonium C.Presl; Arcasplenium T.Moore ex Baker; Brachysorus C.Presl; Callipteridastrum Fée; Callipteris Bory; Didymochlamys T.Moore; Digrammaria C.Presl; Lotzea Klotzsch & H.Karst.; Microstegia C.Presl; Monomelangium Hayata; Ochlogramma C.Presl; Oxygonium C.Presl; Pteriglyphis Fée; Triblemma (J.Sm.) Ching

= Diplazium =

Genus of ferns

Diplazium is a genus of ferns that specifically includes the approximately 400 known species of twinsorus ferns. The Greek root is diplazein meaning double: the indusia in this genus lie on both sides of the vein. These ferns were earlier considered part of either the Athyriaceae, Dryopteridaceae, Aspleniaceae, or Polypodiaceae families or recognized as belonging to their own taxonomic family. The Pteridophyte Phylogeny Group classification of 2016 (PPG I) places the genus in the Athyriaceae. The taxonomy of the genus is difficult and poorly known, and by 2009 has never been the subject of a complete monographic study. Their distribution is pantropical, with a few species extending into temperate areas.

The rhizome of the genus Diplazium varies from creeping to erect, and is scaly. Its fronds are deciduous or evergreen, are trophopodic (Note: The trophopod is food storage organ described from a number of North American ferns. It consists of the enlarged and modified leaf base filled with starch storage tissue. See W. H. Wagner, Jr. and D. M. Johnson, Taxon, Vol. 32, No. 2 (May, 1983), pp. 268-269 for more information on this organ.) and are either monomorphic or weakly dimorphic. The stipe is green, deeply grooved from above, and is either scaly or glabrous. It always has two lunate vascular bundles. The blades are either singular or in sets of two and are entirely pinnate, range from oblong-lanceolate to deltate, and from herbaceous to papery. It has linear basal sori that are paired back-to-back on the same vein. The indusium is linear and persistent, and the sporangia are brownish.

Some common species include Diplazium hymenodes, the peacock fern; Diplazium esculentum, the vegetable fern; Diplazium molokaiense, the Molokai twinsorus fern; and Diplazium lonchophyllum, the lance-leaved glade fern.

== Taxonomy ==
Diplazium is in the family Athyriaceae in the eupolypods II clade of the order Polypodiales. The common glade fern of North America, Diplazium pycnocarpon, is found not to belong to that genus, but rather placed in the genus Homalosorus (Diplaziopsidaceae). Two further species formerly placed in the genus have been transferred to a new genus, Desmophlebium.

== Selected species ==
- Diplazium australe
- Diplazium dietrichianum
- Diplazium dilatatum
- Diplazium esculentum
- Diplazium fraxinifolium
- Diplazium hymenodes
- Diplazium laffanianum
- Diplazium melanochlamys
- Diplazium molokaiense
- Diplazium queenslandicum
- Diplazium sibiricum
