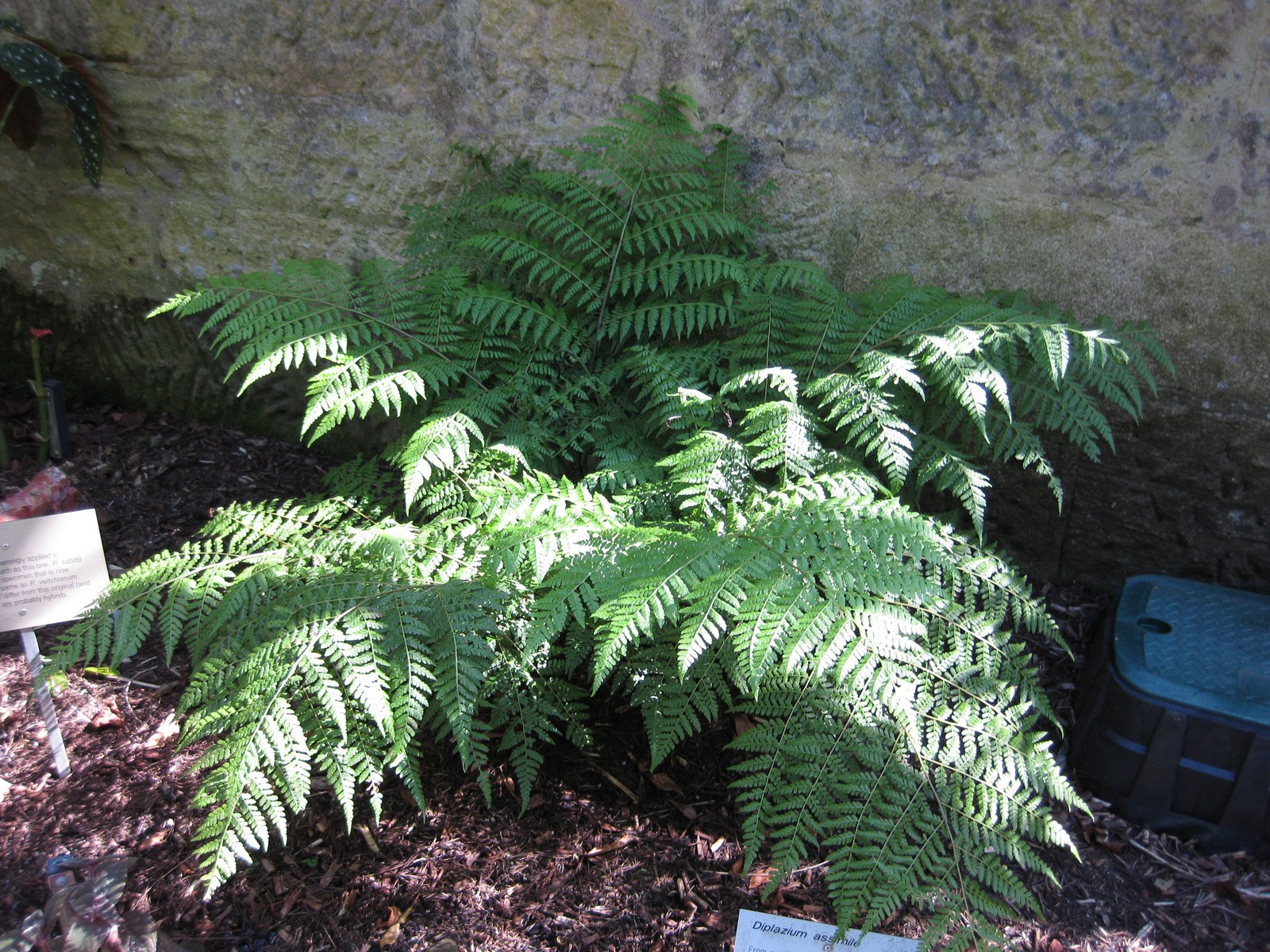

Scientific classification
- Kingdom: Plantae
- Clade: Tracheophytes
- Division: Polypodiophyta
- Class: Polypodiopsida
- Order: Polypodiales
- Suborder: Aspleniineae
- Family: Athyriaceae
- Genus: Diplazium
- Species: D. assimile

Binomial name
- Diplazium assimile (Endl.) Bedd.

Synonyms
- Athyrium assimile (Endl.) C.Presl

= Diplazium assimile =

upside-down fern

Species of fern

Diplazium assimile, the upside-down fern is a tufted fern occurring in eastern Australia. It occurs in damp places in rainforest or tall eucalypt forest.
