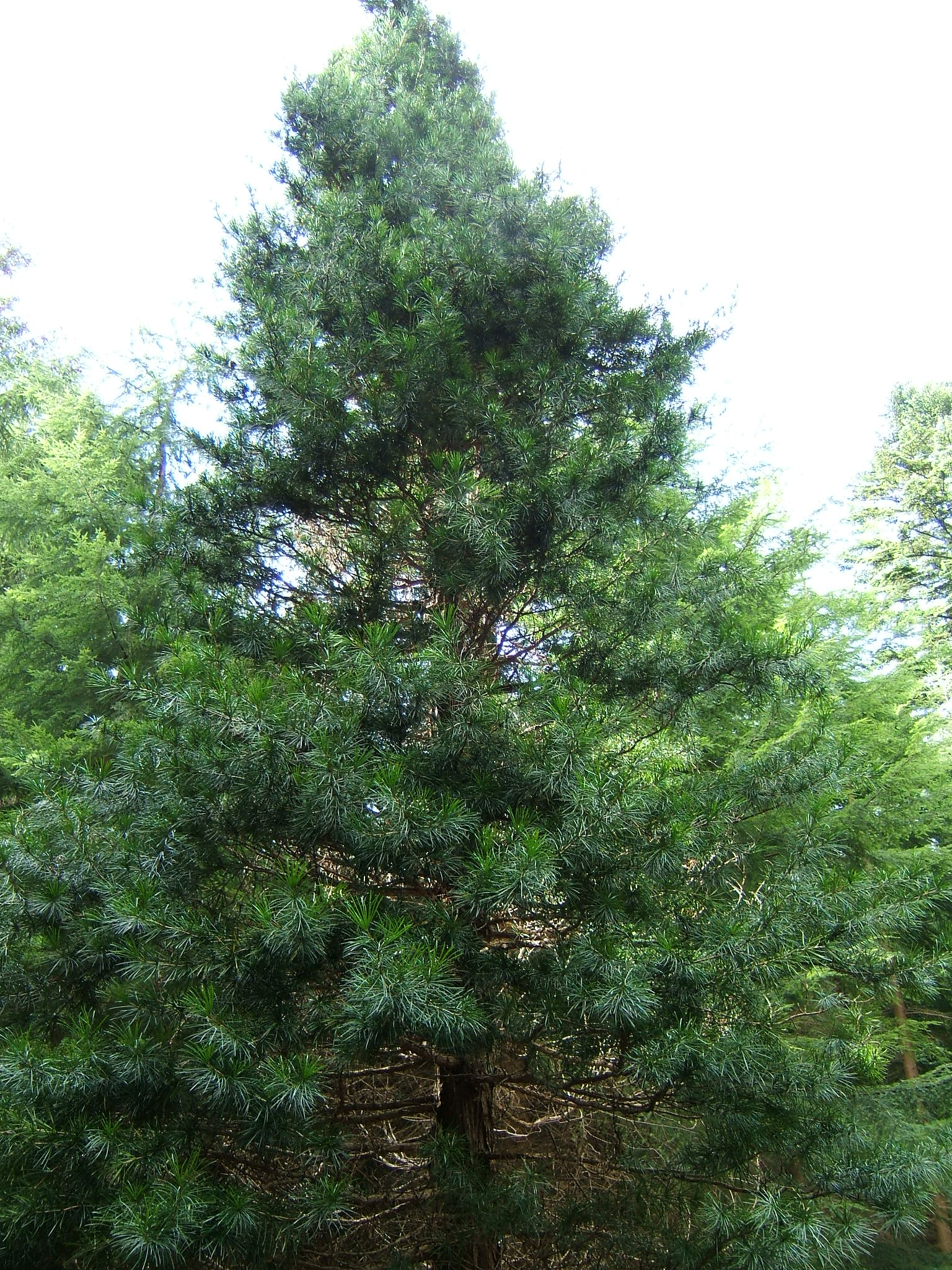

Conservation status
- Near Threatened (IUCN 3.1)

Scientific classification
- Kingdom: Plantae
- Clade: Tracheophytes
- Clade: Gymnosperms
- Division: Pinophyta
- Class: Pinopsida
- Order: Cupressales
- Family: Sciadopityaceae
- Genus: Sciadopitys
- Species: S. verticillata

Binomial name
- Sciadopitys verticillata (Thunb.) Siebold & Zucc.

Synonyms
- Pinus verticillata (Thunb.) Siebold; Podocarpus verticillatus (Thunb.) Jacques; Taxus verticillata Thunb. 1784

= Sciadopitys verticillata =

Sciadopitys verticillata Temporal range: Late Cretaceous–Recent

Species of conifer

Sciadopitys verticillata, the kōyamaki or Japanese umbrella-pine, is a unique conifer endemic to Japan. It is the sole living member of the family Sciadopityaceae and genus Sciadopitys, a living fossil with no close relatives. The oldest fossils of Sciadopitys are from the Late Cretaceous of Japan, and the genus was widespread in Laurasia during most of the Cenozoic, especially in Europe until the Pliocene. A European relative of this species may have been the primary source of Baltic amber, according to some studies.

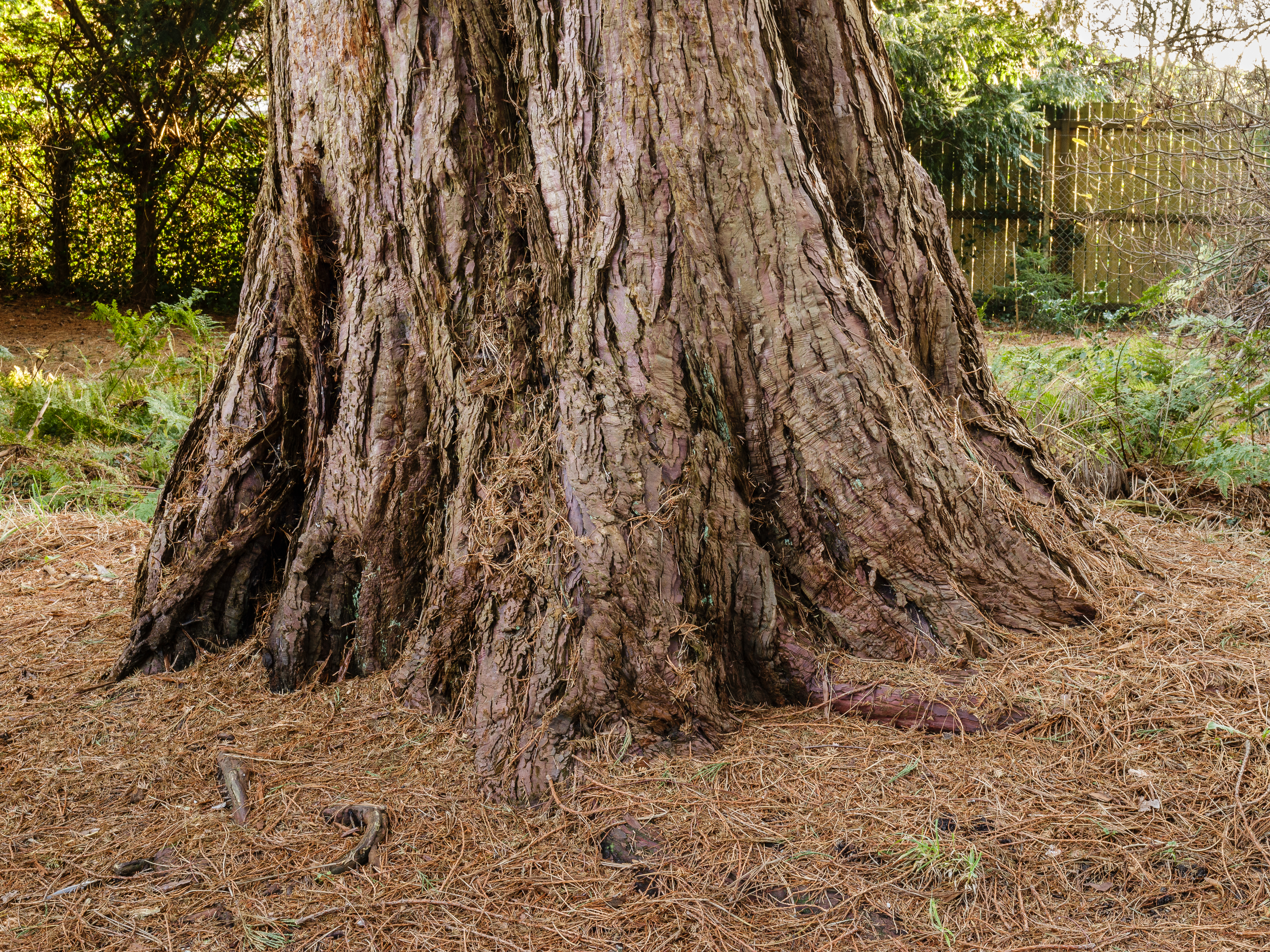
Typical rootstock of a Sciadopitys verticillata (Japanese umbrella-pine)

== Taxonomy ==
Molecular evidence indicates that Sciadopityaceae is the sister group to a clade comprising Taxaceae and Cupressaceae, and has an extremely ancient divergence, having diverged from the rest of the conifers during the early mid-Permian.

There is inconsistent evidence regarding the plant family which produced Baltic amber. Both macrofossil and microfossil evidence suggest a Pinus relative, whereas chemical and infrared microspectroscopy evidence suggest relatives of either Agathis or Sciadopitys.

== Etymology ==
The genus name Sciadopitys comes from Greek sciádos (σκιάδος) meaning 'umbrella' and pitys (πίτυς) meaning 'pine'. The species name verticillata is a descriptive epithet meaning 'whorled'.

== Description ==
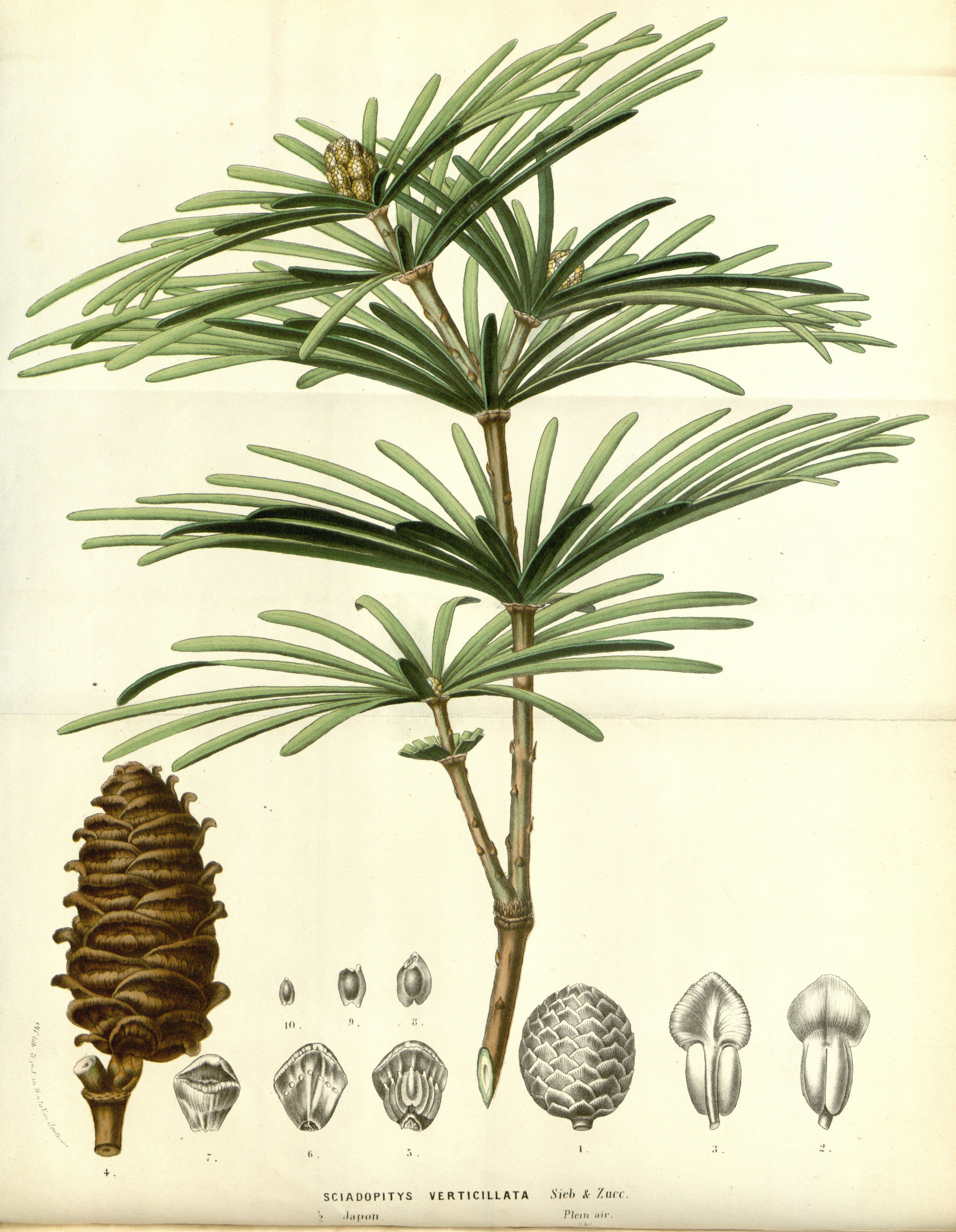
Sciadopitys verticillata from "Flore des serres et des jardins de l'Europe"

S. verticillata is a slow-growing evergreen conifer native to Japan. It typically reaches 10–15 m (33–50 ft) in cultivation, though larger specimens may occur in the wild. The species is characterized by reddish-brown bark that peels in vertical strips and by its distinctive foliage, which consists of whorled, glossy, dark green cladode—modified stem structures that resemble needles—measuring 6–13 cm (2.5–5 in) in length. Seedlings also have a pair of cotyledons and a pair of primary leaves. The cladodes are arranged in umbrella-like clusters at the ends of branches, giving the tree its common name. The seed cones are ovoid to cylindrical, measuring 6–11 cm (2.5–4.25 in) long, and require approximately two years to mature.

== History ==
Sciadopitys verticillata was initially described by Carl Peter Thunberg in 1784 as a species of Pinus. An early attempt to introduce the plant to the West was made around 1853 at the request of Thomas Lobb, but the effort was unsuccessful, as both plants died shortly after arriving in Europe. The plant was successfully introduced to the UK by John Gould Veitch in September 1860. Considered attractive, this tree is popular in gardens, despite its slow growth rate. It has gained the Royal Horticultural Society's Award of Garden Merit.

A stylized representation of the tree (known in Japanese as kōyamaki) was chosen as the Japanese Imperial crest for the Akishino branch of the Imperial Family.

== Gallery ==
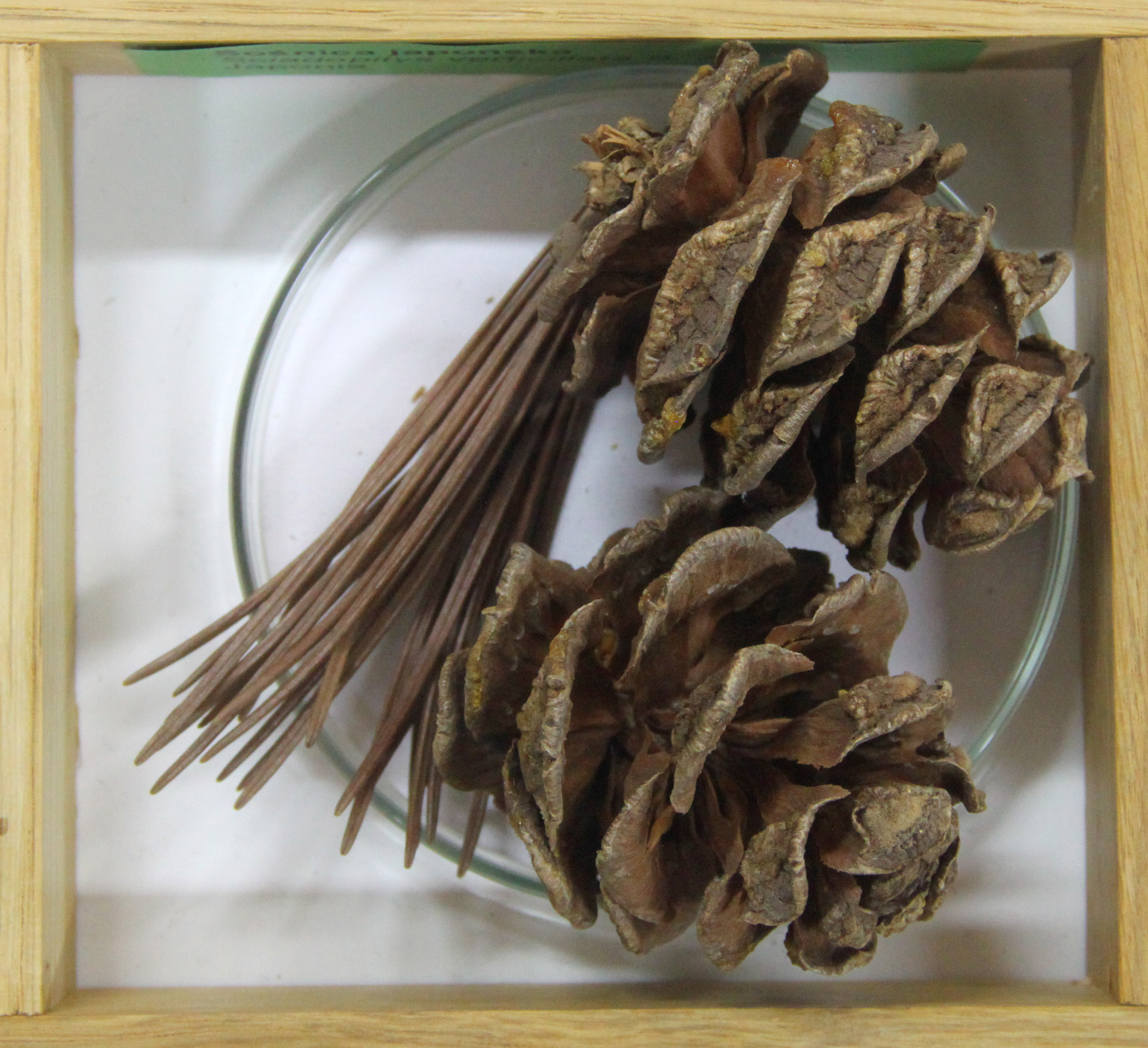
Sciadopitys carpellate cones and dried needles
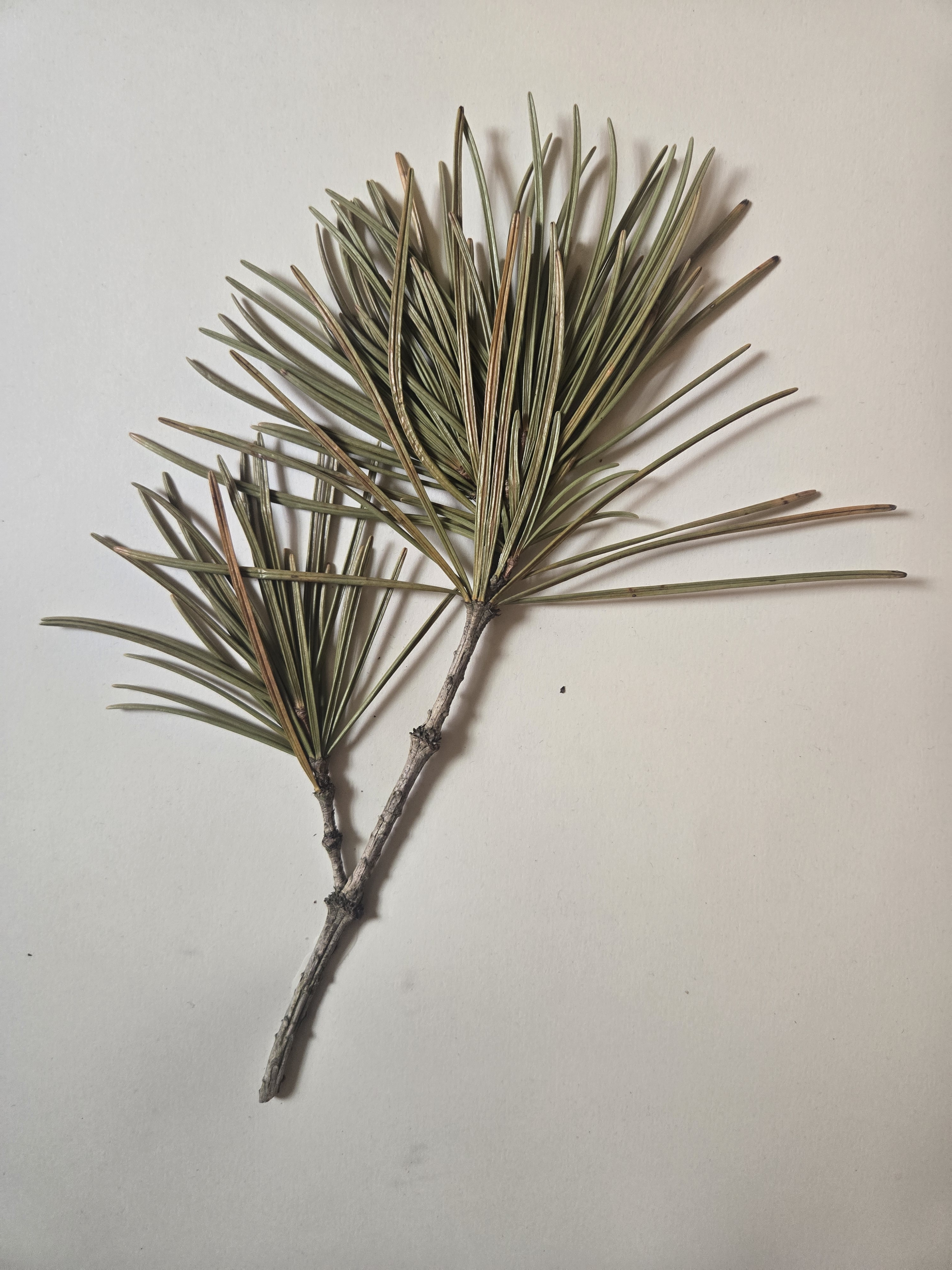
Sciadopitys verticillata herbarium sample

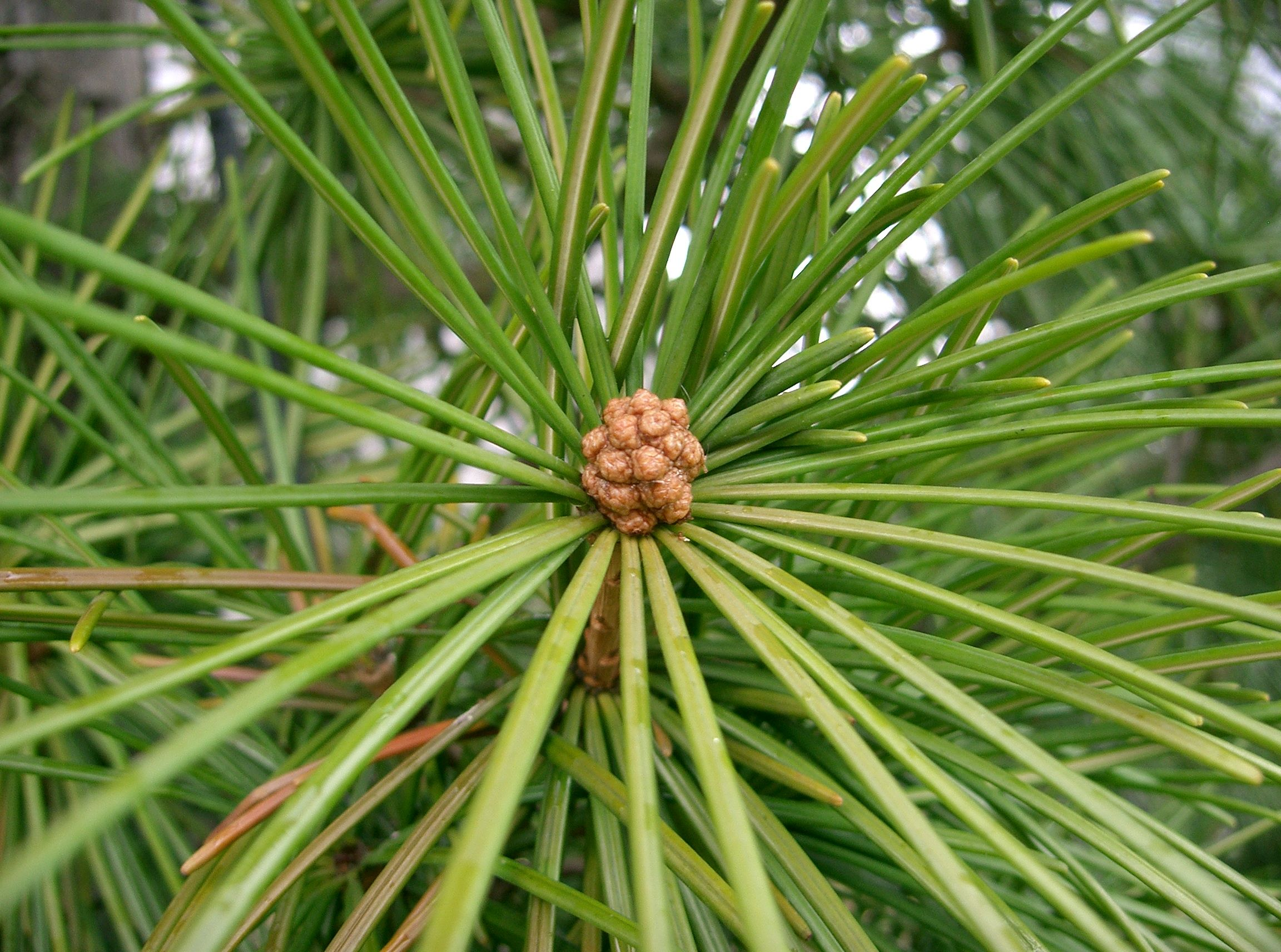
Staminate cones and needles

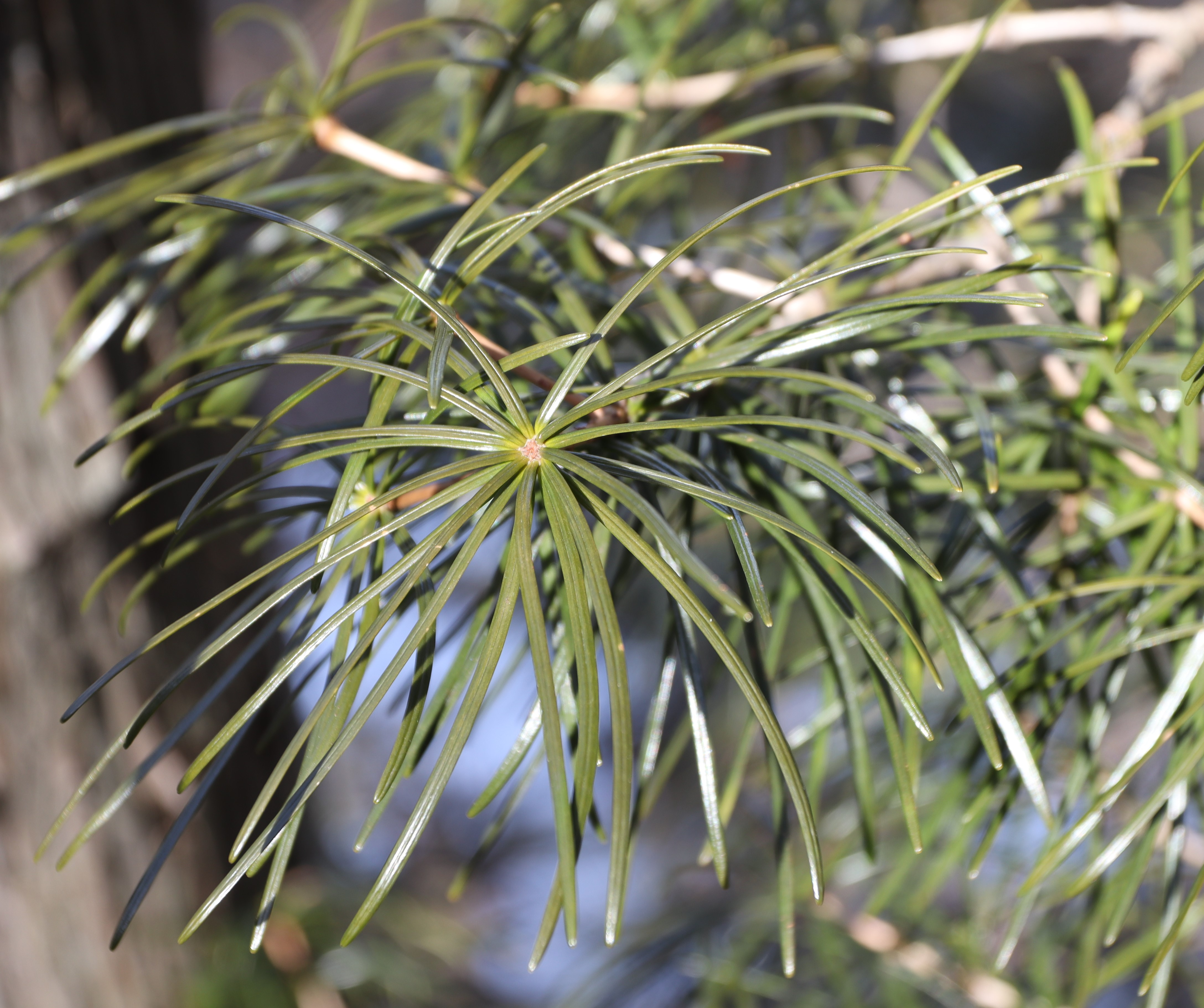
Needles

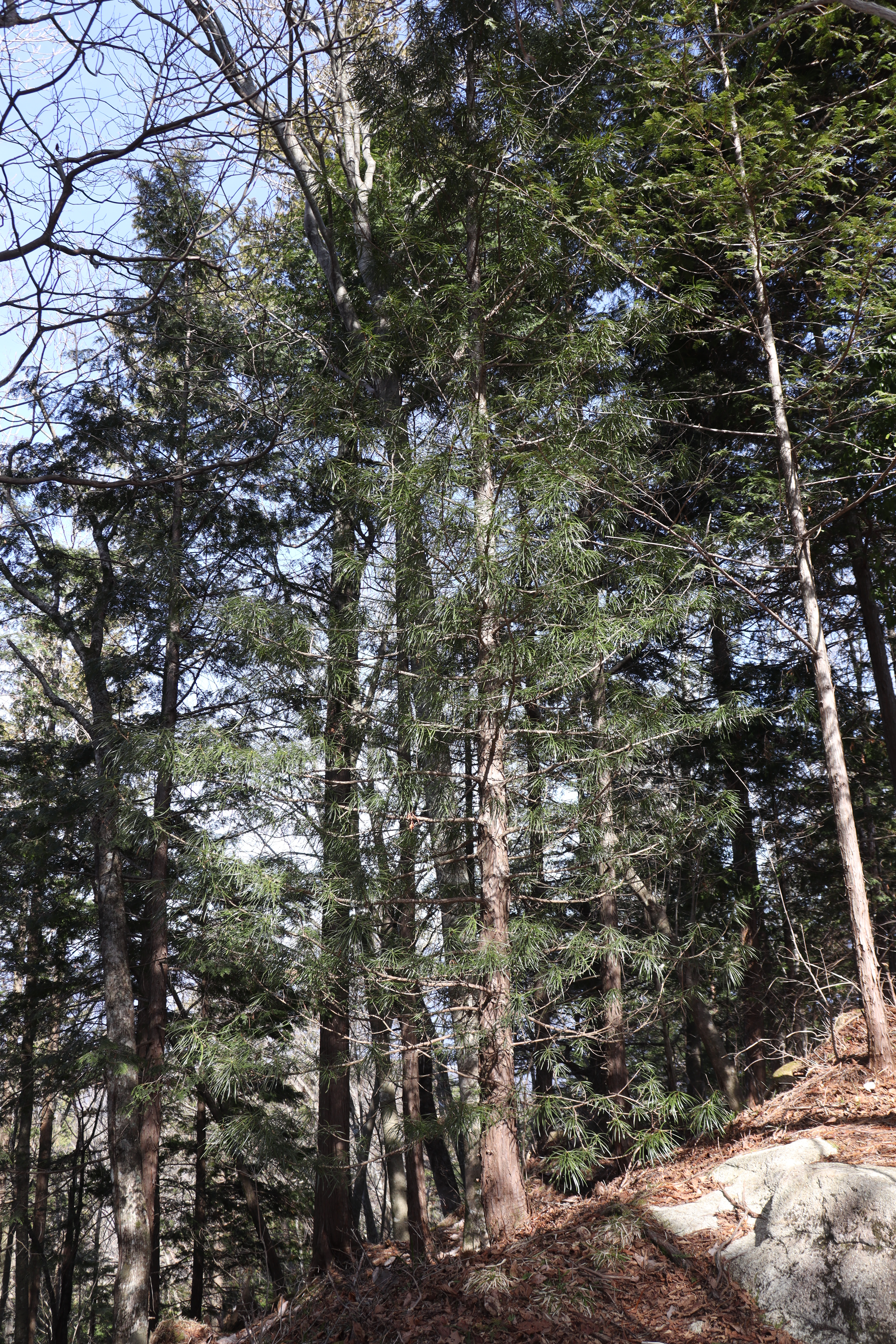
Full tree in Mount Futatsumori, Nakatsugawa, Gifu Prefecture, Japan

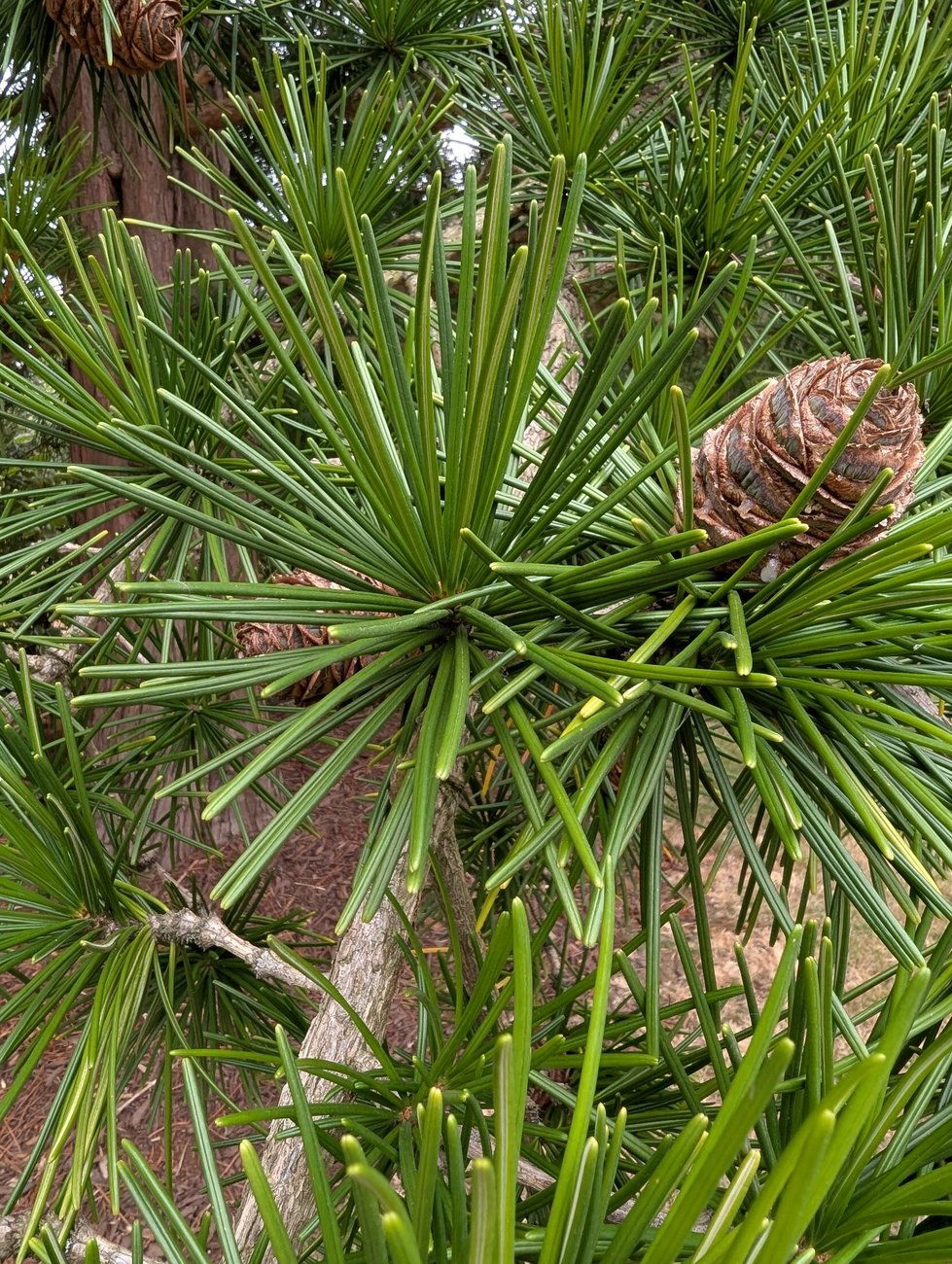
Leaves with a mature cone in Seattle, Washington
