= Peacock fern =

Peacock fern is a common name for several plants and may refer to:

- Diplazium hymenodes, a fern native to the Greater Antilles
- Selaginella uncinata, a spikemoss native to tropical Asia and introduced to the Americas
- Selaginella willdenowii, a spikemoss native to tropical Asia and introduced to the Americas
