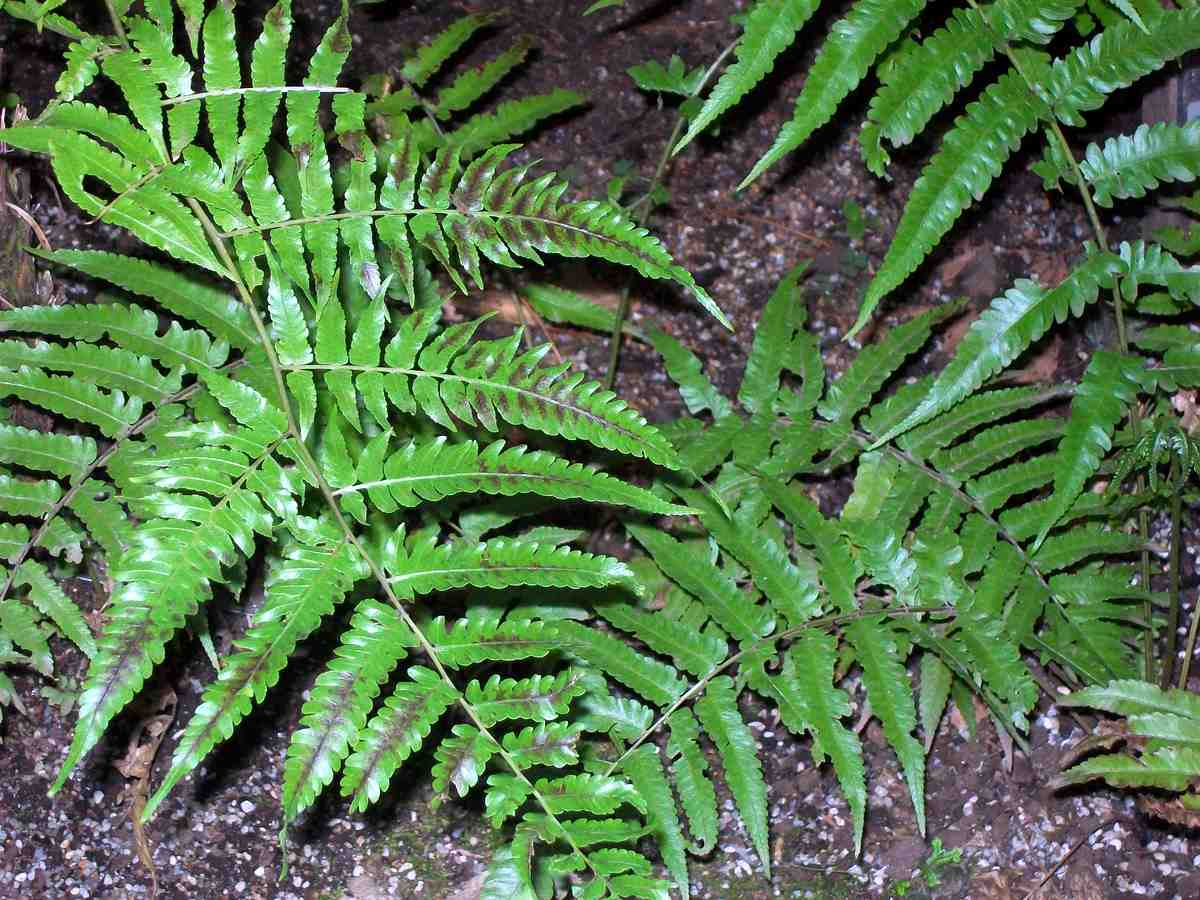

Scientific classification
- Kingdom: Plantae
- Clade: Tracheophytes
- Division: Polypodiophyta
- Class: Polypodiopsida
- Order: Polypodiales
- Suborder: Aspleniineae
- Family: Athyriaceae
- Genus: Diplazium
- Species: D. dietrichianum

Binomial name
- Diplazium dietrichianum (Luerss.) C.Chr.

= Diplazium dietrichianum =

Species of fern

Diplazium dietrichianum is a small fern occurring in eastern Australia. It occurs in shady damp places.
