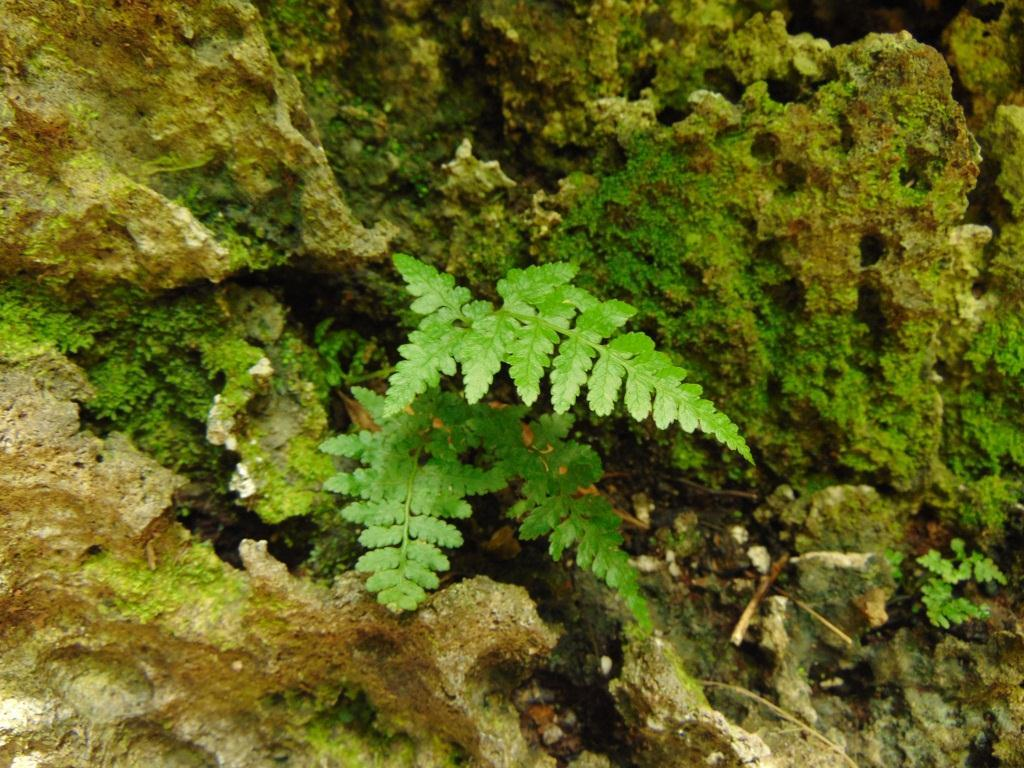

Conservation status
- Extinct in the Wild (IUCN 3.1)

Scientific classification
- Kingdom: Plantae
- Clade: Embryophytes
- Clade: Tracheophytes
- Division: Polypodiophyta
- Class: Polypodiopsida
- Order: Polypodiales
- Suborder: Aspleniineae
- Family: Athyriaceae
- Genus: Diplazium
- Species: D. laffanianum

Binomial name
- Diplazium laffanianum (Baker) C.Chr.

= Diplazium laffanianum =

Species of fern

Diplazium laffanianum, or Governor Laffan's fern, is a species of fern endemic to Bermuda. It is listed as extinct in the wild. It is named after Sir Robert Laffan who sent a living plant to the Royal Botanic Gardens, Kew, in 1880. The fern was found in the mouths of caves and rock crevices until 1905. 1905 was the last time Diplazium laffanianum was seen in the wild. In 2002, the spores were sent to the United States to propagate. After propagation, they were sent back to Bermuda from 2009 to 2019. In 2014, a re-introduction programme was launched using the zoo-raised ferns. As of 2021, there are thirty subjects of Diplazium laffanianum surviving in wild sites.
