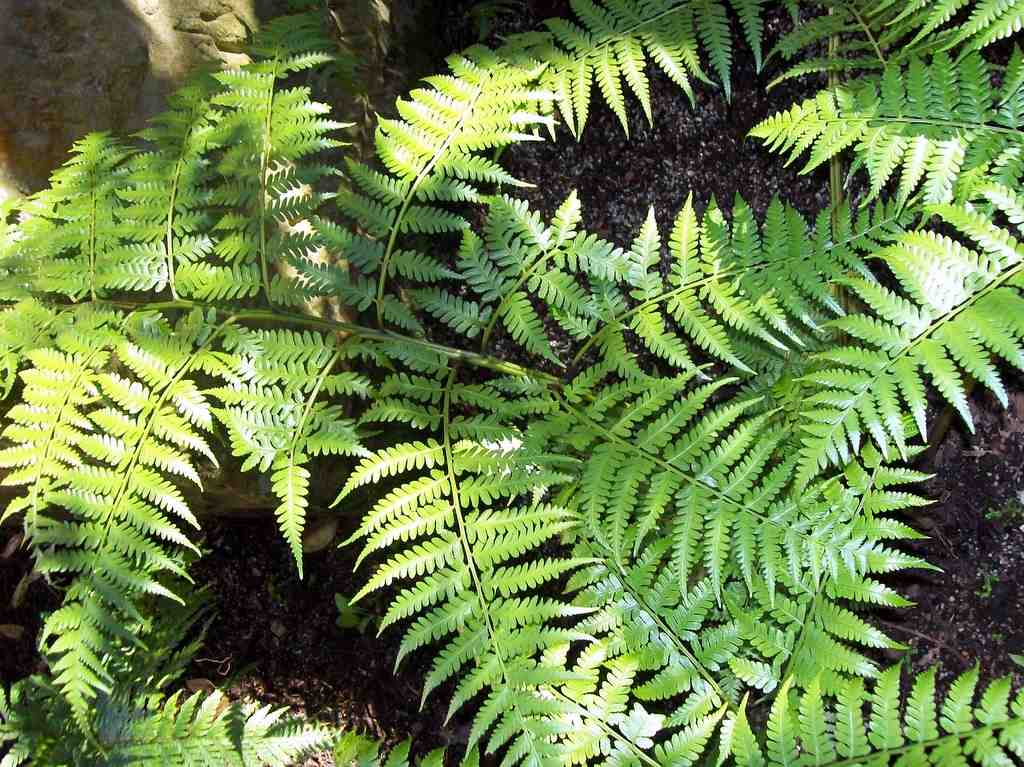

Scientific classification
- Kingdom: Plantae
- Clade: Tracheophytes
- Division: Polypodiophyta
- Class: Polypodiopsida
- Order: Polypodiales
- Suborder: Aspleniineae
- Family: Athyriaceae
- Genus: Diplazium
- Species: D. melanochlamys

Binomial name
- Diplazium melanochlamys (Hook.) T.Moore

= Diplazium melanochlamys =

Species of fern

Diplazium melanochlamys is a ground fern only found on Lord Howe Island in the relatively remote Pacific Ocean between Australia and New Zealand. A common plant growing in forest. Most often seen on the southern half of the island. It can be seen between sea level and the summits of Mount Gower and Mount Lidgbird.

The fronds are up to a metre long, and 60 cm wide. It may develop a trunk of up to 50 cm tall. The covering of the sori is a shining dark brown, almost black.
