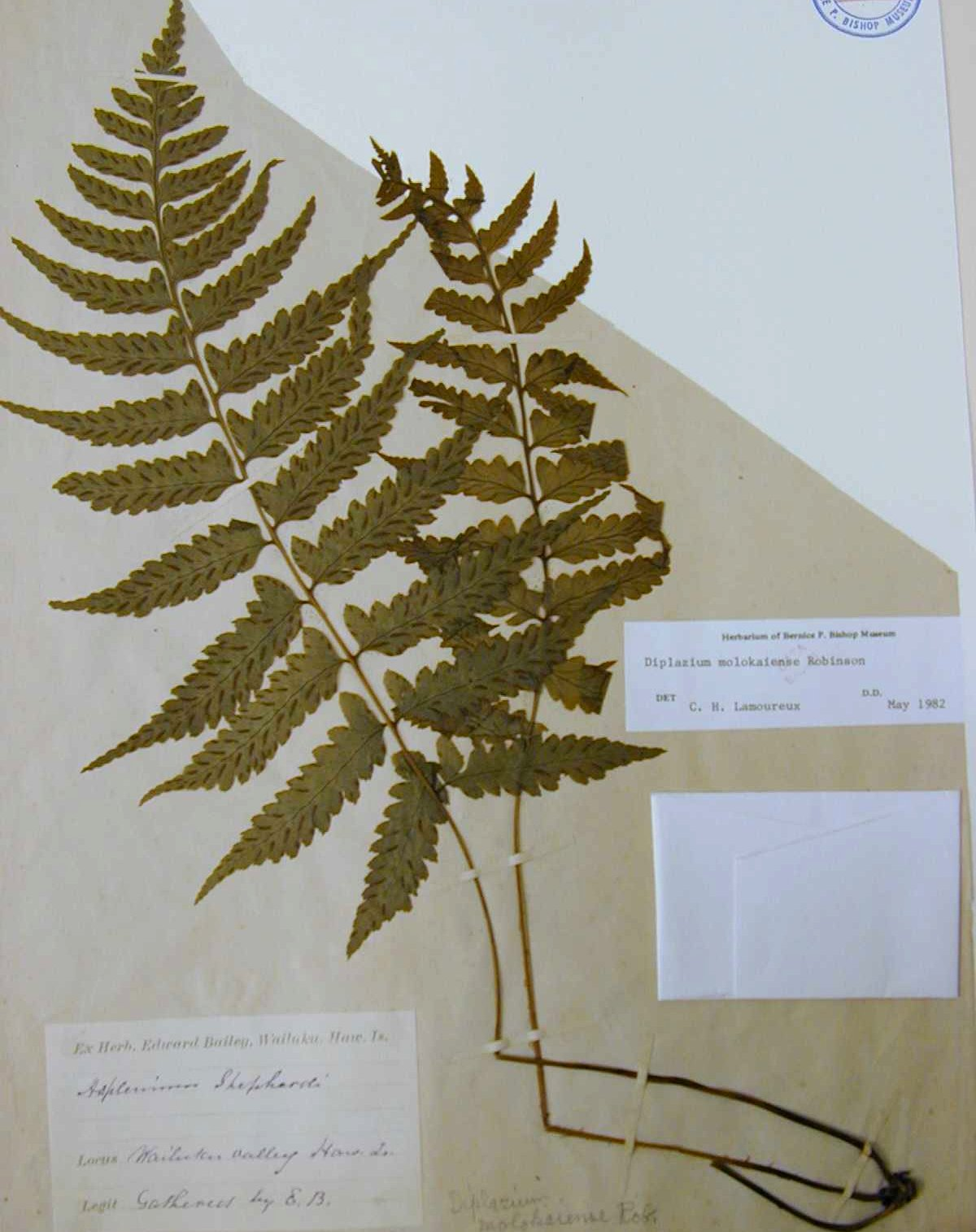
- Herbarium specimen

Conservation status
- Critically Imperiled (NatureServe)

Scientific classification
- Kingdom: Plantae
- Clade: Tracheophytes
- Division: Polypodiophyta
- Class: Polypodiopsida
- Order: Polypodiales
- Suborder: Aspleniineae
- Family: Athyriaceae
- Genus: Diplazium
- Species: D. molokaiense

Binomial name
- Diplazium molokaiense W.J.Rob

= Diplazium molokaiense =

Species of fern

Diplazium molokaiense is a rare species of fern known by the common name Molokai twinsorus fern. It is endemic to Hawaii, where it is one of the rarest ferns. It has historically been found on the islands of Kauai, Oahu, Lanai, Molokai, and Maui, but it is thought to have been extirpated from four of them and today can be found only on Maui where fewer than 70 individual plants remain. The fern was federally listed as an endangered species of the United States in 1994.

== Characteristics ==
This fern has leaves up to about 20 centimeters long growing from a twisted rhizome. Each dark green, shiny leaf is made up of several pairs of leaflets, the largest of which is about 5 × 2 cm. They have pointed tips and slightly rippled edges. The sori are up to a centimeter long and are narrow and somewhat curved in shape.

== Habitat ==
This fern grows in the moist riparian forests on the slopes of two mountains on Maui, one of which is the volcano Haleakalā. It can be found next to streams lined with basalt boulders and near waterfalls and plunge pools. The forest in the area has a mostly open canopy and is dominated by ʻōlapa (Cheirodendron trigynum) and ʻōhiʻa lehua (Metrosideros polymorpha). Other plants of the understory include Ākala (Rubus hawaiensis), Kanawao (Broussaisia arguta) and Coprosma species. The fern grows from walls of mossy rocks alongside other ferns such as Pteris cretica, Polystichum haleakalense, Pneumatopteris sandwicensis and Diplazium sandwichianum.

== Endangered status ==
Threats to this rare fern include habitat destruction and degradation due to the action of feral pigs, flash flooding, and invasive plant species such as Australian blackwood (Acacia melanoxylon), sticky snakeroot (Ageratina adenophora), sweet vernal grass (Anthoxanthum odoratum), fringed willowherb (Epilobium ciliatum), velvet grass (Holcus lanatus), and cat's ear (Hypochoeris radicata).
