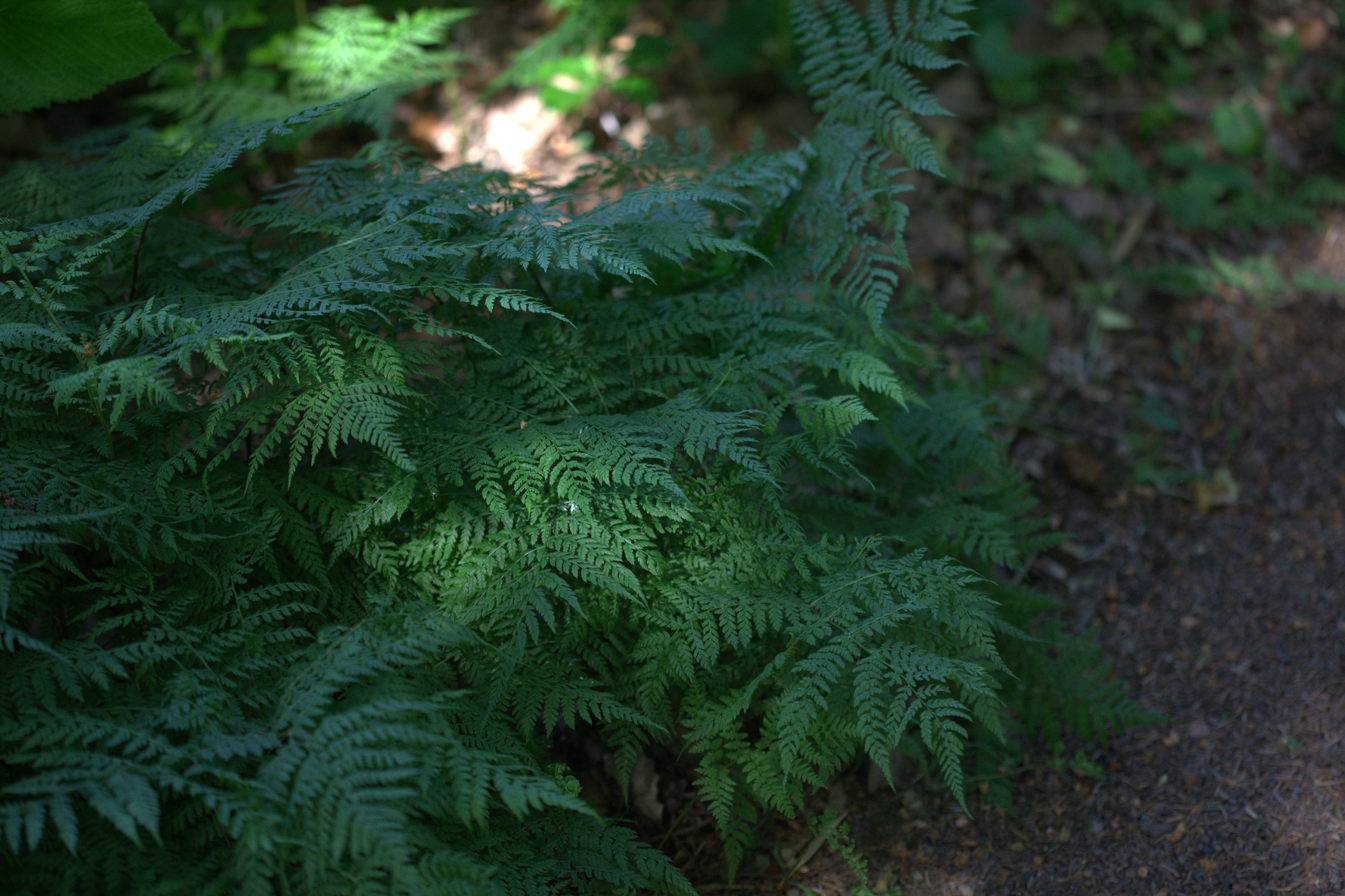

Conservation status
- Near Threatened (IUCN 3.1)

Scientific classification
- Kingdom: Plantae
- Clade: Tracheophytes
- Division: Polypodiophyta
- Class: Polypodiopsida
- Order: Polypodiales
- Suborder: Aspleniineae
- Family: Athyriaceae
- Genus: Diplazium
- Species: D. sibiricum

Binomial name
- Diplazium sibiricum (Turcz. ex Kunze) Sa.Kurata

Synonyms
- Asplenium sibiricum (Turcz.) Sa.Kurata; Athyrium crenatum (Summerf.) Rupr.; Cystopteris crenata Fries; Diplazium sommerfeldtii A.Löve & D.Löve

= Diplazium sibiricum =

Species of fern

Diplazium sibiricum, otherwise known as mole-ladder is a species of fern. It is found in Siberia, across Russia, in Finland, and in northern Asia. They can be found on elevations between 30m-3000m.
