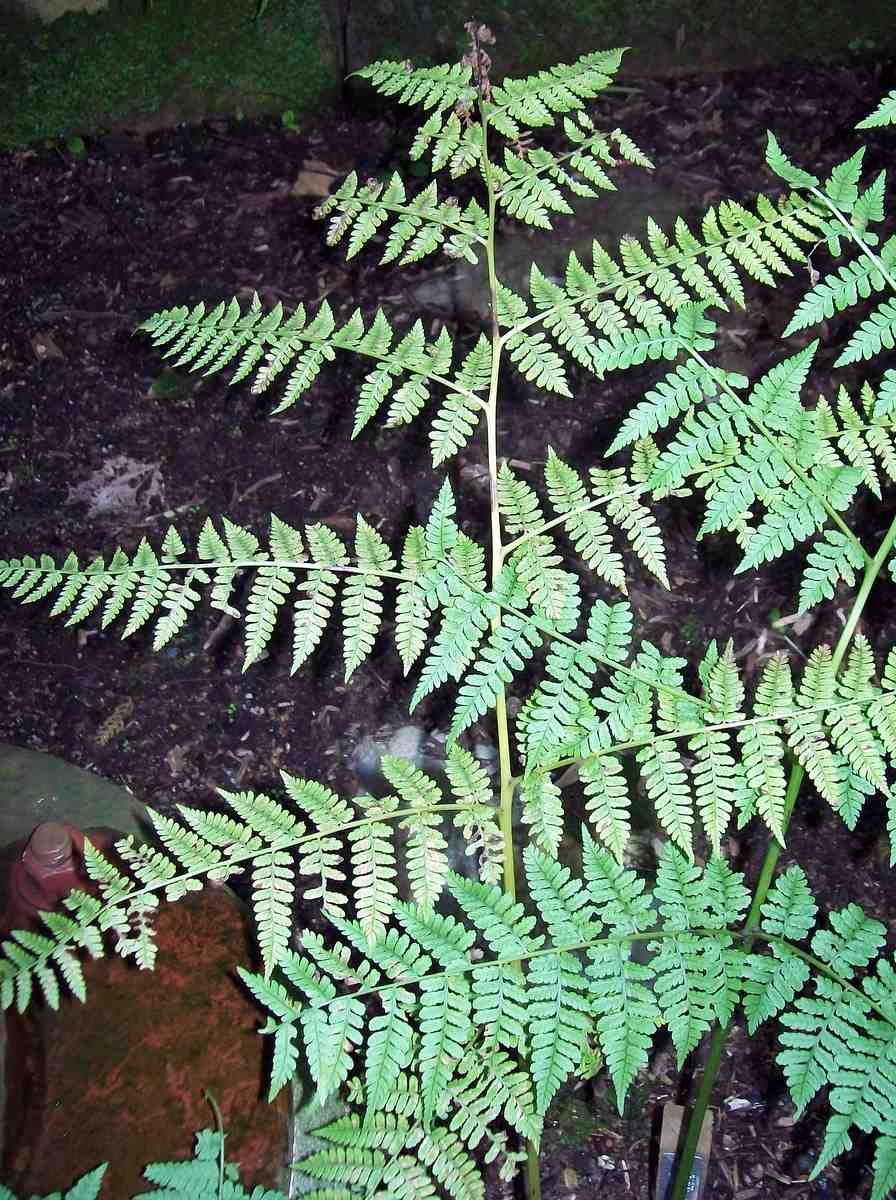
- Austral lady fern

Scientific classification
- Kingdom: Plantae
- Clade: Tracheophytes
- Division: Polypodiophyta
- Class: Polypodiopsida
- Order: Polypodiales
- Suborder: Aspleniineae
- Family: Athyriaceae
- Genus: Diplazium
- Species: D. australe

Binomial name
- Diplazium australe (R.Br.) N.A.Wakef.

Synonyms
- Athyrium australe; Allantodia australis

= Diplazium australe =

Species of fern

Diplazium australe, commonly known as the Austral lady fern, is a small fern occurring in eastern Australia, New Zealand and Norfolk Island. The habitat is moist shaded areas, often occurring in rainforest.

== Original ==
Diplazium australe is an Australian fern belonging to the thyme family, a distinct genus of the female fern family Athyriaceae, consisting of approximately 350–400 species. According to the research, there are more than 70% and 25% of species in the subtropical and neotropical regions, respectively, while only 5% in Africa. According to the study, the crown group of Diplazium originated in Eurasia and completed the initial diversification in the northern hemisphere. The distribution of Diplazium australe is Wet Tropics, Eungella and subtropical and temperate eastern Australia, also in New Zealand. It's terrestrial in shaded gullies in wet sclerophyll forest and rainforest.

The North and South Islands of New Zealand (though it is mostly absent from the drier eastern side of both islands, reaching its apparent southern limits in the west near Greymouth and in the east in the Marlborough Sounds) Norfolk Island, as well as Australia (eastern Queensland, eastern New South Wales, southern Victoria, and Tasmania). Diplazium australe reproduces by spores, and it is precisely because of the long-distance transmission of spores that the population of Diplazium australe is generally dispersed geographically. Allantodia australis R.Br., Athyrium australe (R.Br.) C.Presl; Athyrium umbrosum subp. australe (R.Br.) C.Chr. Athyrium umbrosum var. australe (R.Br.) Domin; Athyrium brownii (J.Sm.) J.Sm.; Athyrium umbrosum sensu G.

== Basic information ==
Diplazium australe is a synonym of Athyrium australe and Allantodia australis. It is a member of the Athyriaceae family, is 0.5–2m tall, and does not flower. On the lateral veins, sporozoites are frequently found in pairs, are oblong, and are covered by a swelling membrane.

Small streams and wet settings, such as moist humus-rich soils in moist forests and moist ravines in tropical rain forests, support the growth of this plant. The habitat is wet shady regions, which are frequently seen in rainforests. Austral Lady Fern is the popular name for this plant. Tufted ferns on the ground (often deciduous in cooler areas). Rhizome up to 80 mm long, with a slender, woody caudex that is first coated in dull dark brown to black scales. Fronds are arcuate, glabrous, membranous, brittle, dark green, with rachis grooves that open at junctions with pinna midrib grooves. Stipe 150–800 mm long, deeply 3-grooved, black and scaly at the base. 3-pinnate, widely deltoid lamina, 0.25–1.2 0.2–0.9 m Pinnules are 5-252-10 mm long, rectangular, and have a wide base connected to the axis. The edges are bluntly serrated or shallowly lobed less than half-way to the costule, abaxially decurrent, and the apex is obtuse. Sori 2–3 mm long, 3–5 per pinnule, elongated along one side of a vein, generally solitary, but occasionally paired along both sides; indusium pale brown, elongated, connected to vein on one side, free edge serrated, brittle. Alluvial forest, river flats, gullies, and swamp forest are abundant in coastal, lowland, and montane wooded ecosystems. It's common to find it on a rocky pasture or under willows. Frequently encountered in metropolitan settings. Diplazium australe is also a vascular plant whose survival period is often referred to as alternation of generations, characterized by diploid sporophyte and haploid gametophyte stages. Its life cycle includes:

1. The sporophyte stage (diploid) stage produces haploid spores by meiosis.
2. Spores form gametophytes through cell division, gametophytes are usually heart-shaped structures, 2–3 mm wide, with root-like hairs on the surface.
3. Gametophytes produce gametes through mitosis
4. Mirrors with movable flagella fertilize eggs attached to prothallus
5. The fertilized egg is a diploid zygote and grows into a sporophyte through mitosis.

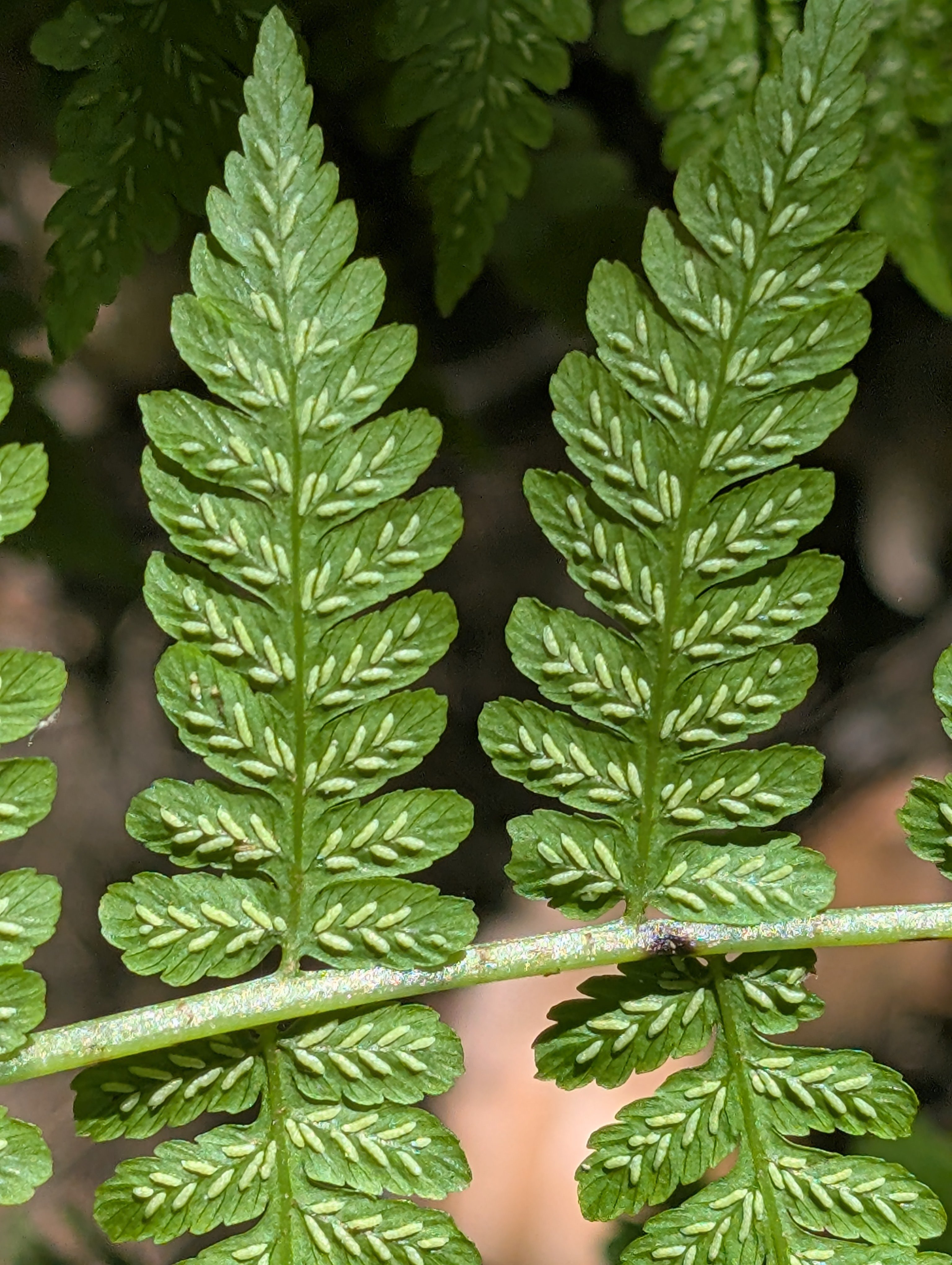
Diplazium australe at the Great North Walk, Lane Cove National Park, showing developing sori

== Organization ==
Diplazium These ferns have a reticular (dictyostelium) vascular system that reflects the helical phyllotaxy of the shoots, and the vascular pattern of each species has a specific relationship to the phyllotaxy. The phyllotaxy fraction can be determined by the number of branches in the cross-section of the stem. The same numerical relationship was also found between the number of coaxial stem bundles and phyllotaxy in seed plants. There are some phylogenetic similarities between ferns and seed plants, such as between stem vascular patterns and phyllotaxy. Rhizome erect, to 8 cm long, with dull dark brown to black scales. Fronds arcuate. Stipe 24–80 cm long, black and scaly at the base, deeply 3-grooved. Lamina 3-pinnate, 30–120 cm long, broadly triangular, 20–90 cm wide, membranous, brittle, dark green. Pinnules oblong, 5–25 mm long, 2–10 mm wide; base broadly attached to the axis; margins bluntly toothed or shallowly lobed less than half-way to the costule, decurrent on the lower side; apex obtuse. Sori 1–2 mm long, 3–5 per pinnule, mostly single; indusium pale brown, fragile. Rhizome erect, sometimes forming a short trunk, covered with dull black scales. Fronds almost erect, mostly 0.4–1.2 m long, sometimes to 2 m; stipe stout and fleshy, dark at the base, paler above; secondary rachises not much darker at their junction with the main rachis; lamina 2-pinnate with secondary pinnae lobed almost to midvein; ultimate segments 5–25 mm long, toothed.

The leaves are soft, pale green broadly triangular, 2–3 times divided fronds, to 1 m wide. Segments stalked, final segments lobed or divided, margins with rounded teeth. Grooves in main and side midribs flow together, forming ridges at junction. Stem half length of frond. Rhizomes short and erect, stout, woody, apex densely covered with scales; scales lanceolate, 7–9 mm long, brownish-brown, with brown narrow margins, glossy, thick membranous, margins with small teeth. Leaves clustered; petiole fleshy, 6–13 cm long, 1.5-2.5 cm thick, light green, base densely covered with the same scales as those on rhizomes, upwards and leaves are sparsely covered with small brown-brown star-shaped scales, later part shedding The leaves are linear-lanceolate, 15–30 cm long, 4–7 cm wide, with a pointed tail, bipinnate; pinnae 20-35 pairs, 1-1.5 cm apart, opposite, or only at base, alternate upward, nearly spreading, sessile, slightly sparse from each other, lower pinna slightly shortened, middle pinna 2.5–4 cm long, 7–8 mm wide, linear, slightly Sickle-shaped, blunt or round head, base is slightly oblique circular truncation, slightly asymmetric, upper side close to leaf axis, pinnate; pinnae 10–16 pairs, alternate or subopposite, obliquely spread, each other Closely connected, linear, more or less upwardly curved, 3–4.5 mm long, 1.5 mm wide, rounded or blunt, base connate with rachis and connected by broad wings, entire, base paired or only the upper side is often doubled To three-lobed, the lobes are the same shape as the pinnae and much shorter. The veins of the leaves are obvious and raised above, but not visible below. Each pinnae has one small vein, which does not reach the leaf edge. The leaves are nearly succulent, grass green when dry, densely covered with brown-brown star-shaped small scales when they are young, then gradually become smooth on the top, and one or two pieces remain on the bottom; The top is raised, with broad wings on both sides, all sparsely covered with one or two small scales. Sporangia linear, 2–3 mm long, brown, 1 per pinnae, born on the middle and upper side of the veinlets; sporangia linear, pale green, later gray-brown, membranous, entire, open to leaves side.

Sporophyte structure of Diplazium australe:

- Stem: including underground stolonifer rhizomes, and aboveground stolonifer rhizomes, partly with adventitious roots, and capable of growing new shoots
- Leaves: According to the historical division between fern specialists and seed plant specialists, the leaves of Diplazium australe are commonly referred to as thallus and are one of the organs used for photosynthesis. The new leaves of Diplazium australe usually expand gradually from a constricted spiral as they grow, and this expansion and growth pattern is known as crozier or fiddlehead. The leaves of Diplazium australe include two types:
- Trophophyll: This type of leaf is similar to the green leaves of seed plants, only photosynthesizing without producing spores.
- Sporophyll: This type of leaves is similar to the scales of pine cones and produces mostly spores. The Sporophy of Diplazium australe is not specific and can also produce sugars through photosynthesis.
- Root: A fibrous structure that does not perform photosynthesis, similar to the root structure of seed plants, and absorbs water and nutrients from the soil. The root of Diplazium australe differs from the root of the seed structure, and its refined structure includes:
- Prothallus: A green photosynthetic structure, one cell thick, usually heart- or kidney-shaped, 3–10 mm long and 2–8 mm wide. The fronds produce gametes by:
- Spermatozoa: Small spherical structures that produce flagellar sperm.
- Archegonium: A bottle-like structure that produces an egg at the bottom, and sperm swims to the neck.
- Sporangia: The reproductive structure of ferns. These are pouches or capsules that contain spores through which ferns reproduce. This structure is located on the underside of the leaf and is arranged in a pattern related to the veins of the leaf. Sometimes ferns provide a layer of protection for sacs called sycamores.
- False root: A root-like structure composed of individual elongated cells that absorb water and nutrients.

== Variable ==
Due to the morphological diversity and lack of molecular phylogenetic analysis of these ferns, as well as the lack of understanding of genus boundaries and affiliations, Diplazium was subsequently investigated based on the study of more than 6000 DNA nucleotides in seven plastid genome regions. This study provides phylogenetic data on diplazium, identifying 4 well-supported clades of this subgenus: Pseudallantodia, Diplazium, Sibirica, and Callipteris, and 8 robust subgenera Genus clade, redefining Diplazium according to different morphological features and subordinate taxa, to 2020 A total of 208 endemic species have been identified in Australia since 2000, including subferns and lycopodium flora. Also trans-island and Pacific spread meant the separation and diversification of the subgenus Callipteris.

Diplazium australe is occasionally confused with Deparia petersenii subsp. congrua, with which it shares a lot of space, partially because both Diplazium and Deparia contain sori that are organized in a herringbone pattern, which can also be mistaken for Asplenium. The sori, which are paired back-to-back along the veins, distinguish Diplazium and Deparia from Asplenium. Diplazium differs from Deparia in that its fronds are considerably bigger, more divided, and glabrous, and the rachis groove is open and confluent with the grooves of the pinna midribs (rather than being closed at junctions with pinna midrib grooves).

From spores and rooted bits, it's simple. It grows quickly and is prone to becoming weedy. It prefers a shady location, but may grow in broad sun if planted in constantly humid soil. During the winter, it dies down to the rhizome in the colder sections of the nation. This species was originally thought to be extremely rare. As a consequence of human disturbance, it appears to have thrived and increased its distribution in New Zealand, and it is now one of our most common, weedy, indigenous urban ferns diplazium: Southern, from the Latin australis. From Greek diplasios 'double', referring to the double coating over the spores australe: Southern. Diplazium australe is not of immediate economic importance and is generally used as a biofertilizer because its nitrogen-fixing ability converts nitrogen from the air into compounds that other plants can use. Diplazium australe can also be used as a raw material for anthelmintics, and in some areas is used as a food source by indigenous societies. In addition to their economical role, Diplazium australe have certain aesthetic value, they can be used in garden design, in the production of handicrafts, often as painting elements and decorative elements. In some cases, the value provided by Diplazium australe is negative. For example, in the plantation industry, Diplazium australe is a weed whose ability to absorb nutrients from the soil is much higher than that of agricultural crops, and is usually processed in batches.
