= Diplazium hymenodes =

Scientific classification
- Kingdom: Plantae
- Clade: Tracheophytes
- Division: Polypodiophyta
- Class: Polypodiopsida
- Order: Polypodiales
- Suborder: Aspleniineae
- Family: Athyriaceae
- Genus: Diplazium
- Species: D. hymenodes

Binomial name
- Diplazium hymenodes Á. Löve & D. Löve

Species of fern

Diplazium hymenodes, sometimes called the peacock fern (although this name is also used for other species), is a twinsorus fern in the wood fern family of polypod ferns. It is native to Puerto Rico, but also occurs in Jamaica and Cuba. It prefers a moist growing environment at low to low-middle elevations.
