= Diplazium fraxinifolium =

Scientific classification
- Kingdom: Plantae
- Clade: Tracheophytes
- Division: Polypodiophyta
- Class: Polypodiopsida
- Order: Polypodiales
- Suborder: Aspleniineae
- Family: Athyriaceae
- Genus: Diplazium
- Species: D. fraxinifolium

Binomial name
- Diplazium fraxinifolium C.Presl

Synonyms
- Anisogonium elegans C.Presl; Anisogonium fraxinifolium (C.Presl) C.Presl; Asplenium elegans (C.Presl) Mett.; Athyrium fraxinifolium (C.Presl) Milde; Athyrium riparium (Holttum) Holttum; Callipteris elegans (C.Presl) J.Sm. ex Fée; Callipteris fraxinifolia (C.Presl) J.Sm. ex T.Moore; Diplazium austrosylvaticum Fraser-Jenk. & Benniamin; Diplazium elegans (C.Presl) Hook.; Diplazium luzoniense Spreng.; Diplazium riparium Holttum; Oxygonium elegans J.Sm.

Species of fern

Diplazium fraxinifolium is a species of fern in the family Athyriaceae. It is found from India through Malesia to New Guinea.
