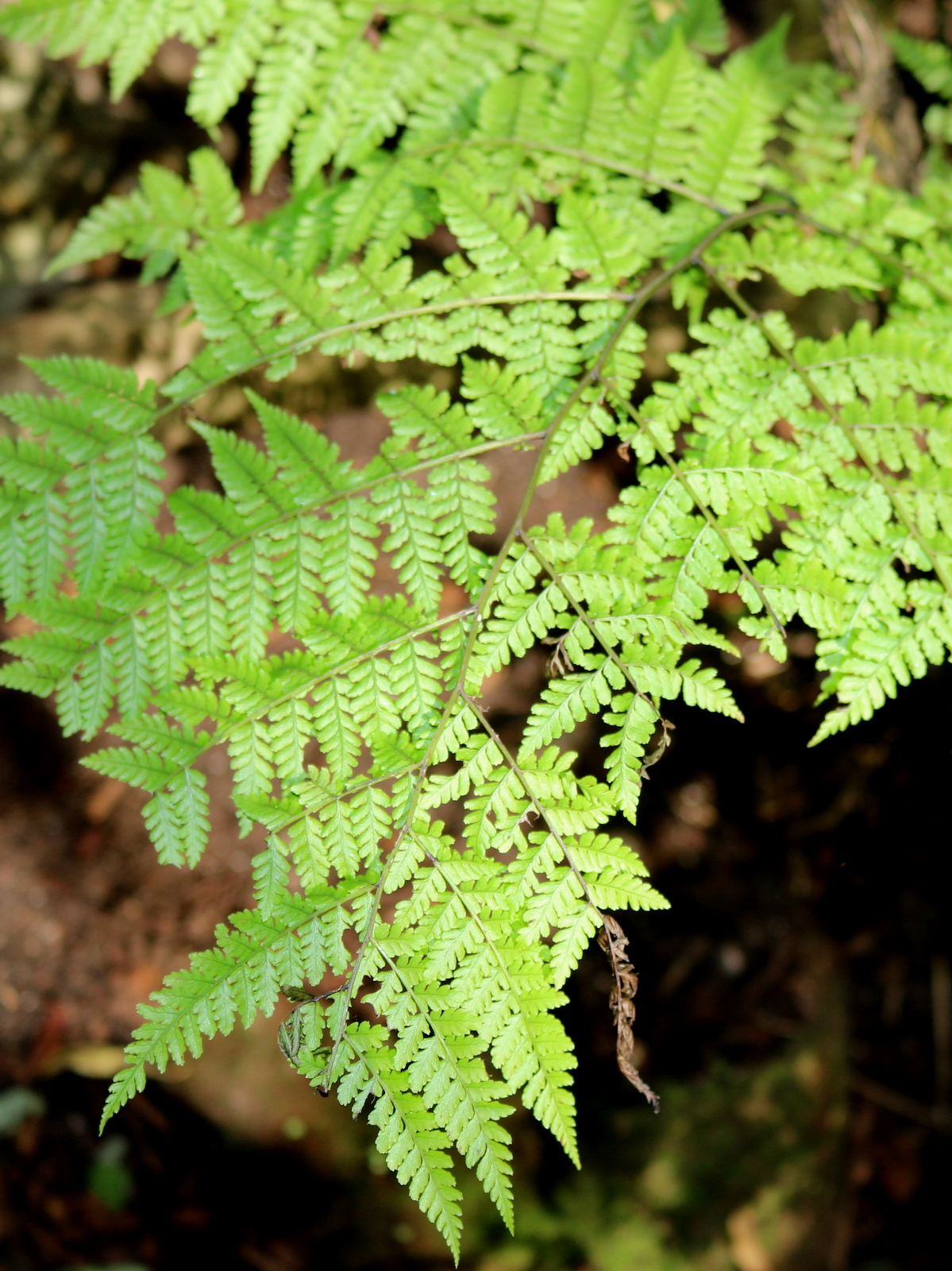
- Royal Botanic Gardens, Sydney

Scientific classification
- Kingdom: Plantae
- Clade: Tracheophytes
- Division: Polypodiophyta
- Class: Polypodiopsida
- Order: Polypodiales
- Suborder: Aspleniineae
- Family: Athyriaceae
- Genus: Diplazium
- Species: D. queenslandicum

Binomial name
- Diplazium queenslandicum Tindale

= Diplazium queenslandicum =

Species of fern

Diplazium queenslandicum is a fern occurring in tropical north eastern Australia. This species is found in rainforest on the mountain ranges and tablelands above 500 metres altitude, usually in moist situations near streams. The type specimen was collected in 1960 from near Innisfail, Queensland.
