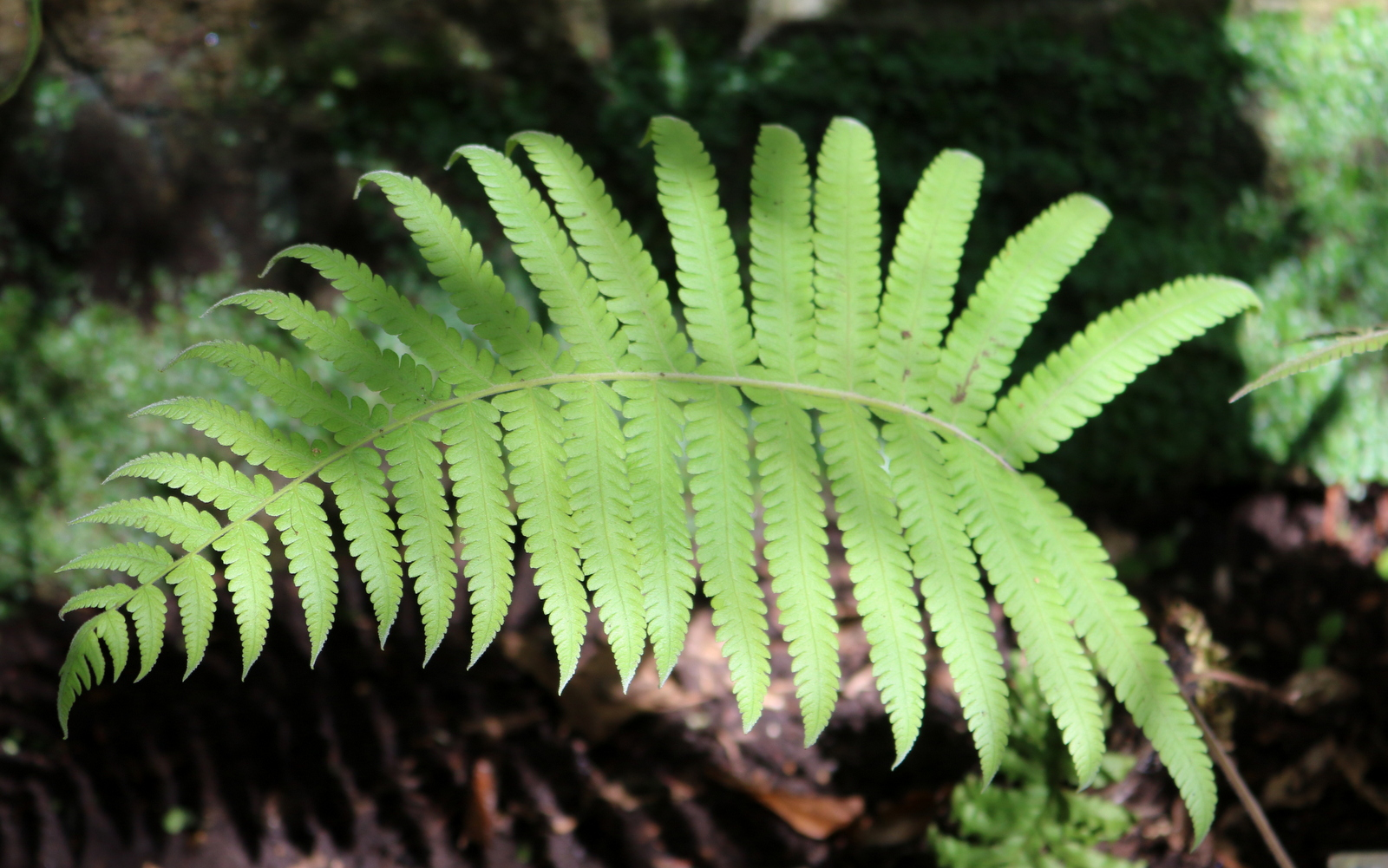
- Royal Botanic Gardens, Sydney

Scientific classification
- Kingdom: Plantae
- Clade: Tracheophytes
- Division: Polypodiophyta
- Class: Polypodiopsida
- Order: Polypodiales
- Suborder: Aspleniineae
- Family: Athyriaceae
- Genus: Diplazium
- Species: D. dilatatum

Binomial name
- Diplazium dilatatum Blume

Synonyms
- Athyrium dilatatum (Blume) Milde

= Diplazium dilatatum =

Species of fern

Diplazium dilatatum is a small fern occurring in India, Indochina, Malesia and Australia as far south as Wauchope, New South Wales. The habitat is moist shaded areas. The type specimen was collected from Burangrang mountain in Java.
