= Christian Luerssen =

German botanist

Christian Luerssen (6 May 1843, Bremen – 28 June 1916) was a German botanist. He was an authority in the field of pteridology.

In 1872, at Leipzig, he graduated as a university teacher of botany, and was later appointed professor of botany at the Forest Academy at Neustadt-Eberswalde (1884). From 1888, he served as a professor at the University of Königsberg. After his death, a portion of his botanical collection (including European pteridophytes) was donated by Otto Bjurling to the Swedish Museum of Natural History.

Luerssen was the taxonomic authority of the family Sciadopityaceae (1877). He has a number of plant species named after him, such as Koeleria luerssenii (grass species) and Cassia luerssenii (family Fabaceae).

== Written works ==
- Filices Graeffeanae. Beitrag zur kenntniss der farnflora der Viti-, Samoa-, Tonga- und Ellice's inseln, 1871 - Contribution to the knowledge of ferns of Viti Levu, Samoa, Tonga and the Ellice Islands.
- Grundzüge der Botanik (11 editions between 1877 and 1893) - Basics of botany.
- Die Farnpflanzen, oder, Gefassbündelkryptogamen (Pteridophyta) - Ferns, or vascular-bundle cryptogams (Pteridophyta).
- Handbuch der systematischen botanik, mit besonderer berücksichtigung der arzneipflanzen. Volume 1, 1879 - Manual of plant systematics, with special consideration to medicinal plants.
- Die Pflanzen der Pharmacopoea germanica botanisch erläutert, 1883 - Plants of the Pharmacopoeia Germanica botanical explained.
- Die einführung japanischer waldbäume in die deutschen forsten, 1885 - Introduction of Japanese forest trees into German forests.
