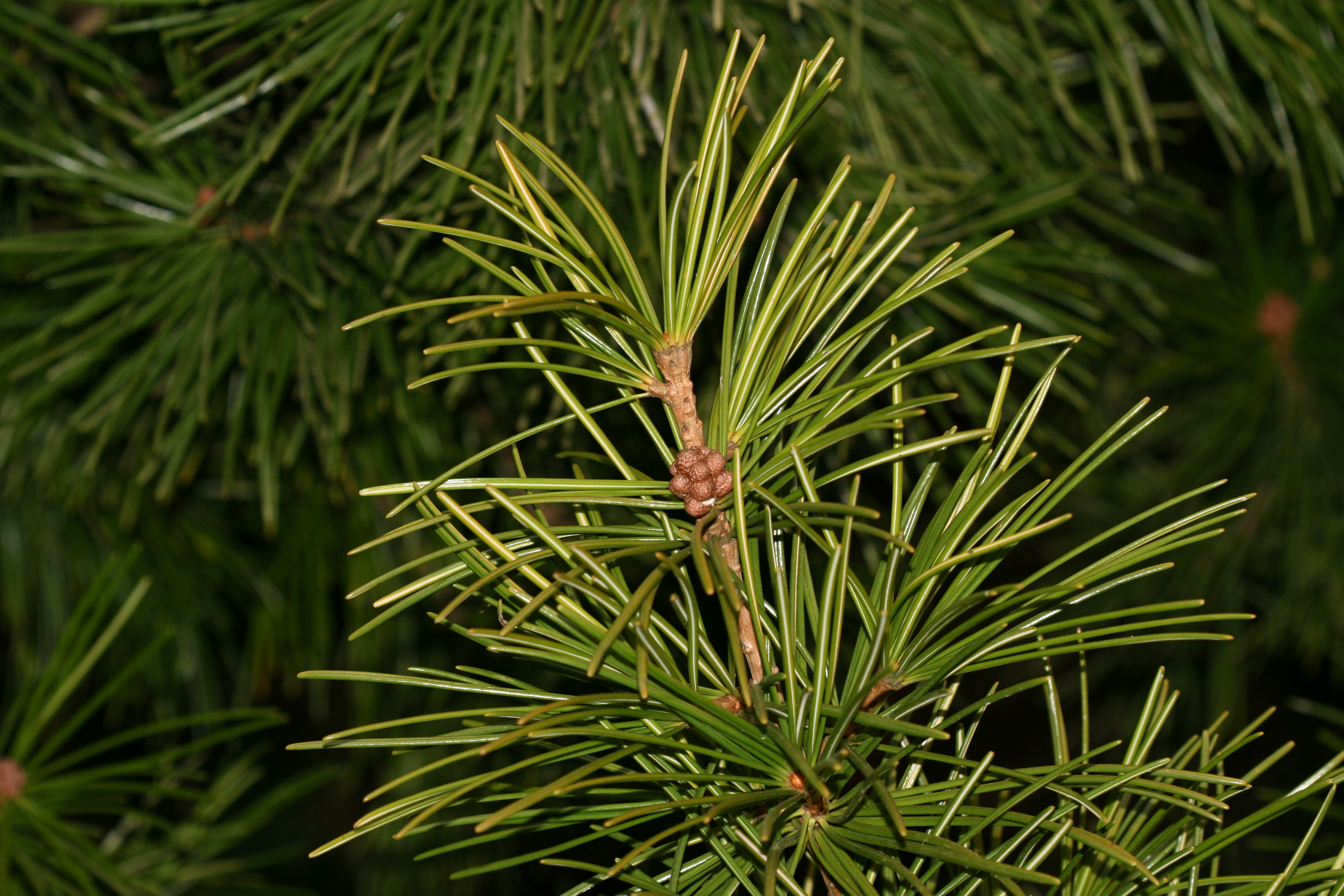
- Sciadopitys verticillata

Scientific classification
- Kingdom: Plantae
- Clade: Embryophytes
- Clade: Tracheophytes
- Clade: Gymnosperms
- Division: Pinophyta
- Class: Pinopsida
- Order: Cupressales
- Family: Sciadopityaceae
- Genus: Sciadopitys; Siebold & Zucc.

Species
- Sciadopitys verticillata; †Sciadopitys tertiaria; †Sciadopitys yezo-koshizakae

= Sciadopitys =

Sciadopitys Temporal range: Late Cretaceous–Recent

Genus of trees

Sciadopitys, commonly called kōyamaki trees, or umbrella pines, are a genus of conifers with a single extant species, S. vercillata, endemic to Japan. It is the sole living genus in the family Sciadopityaceae. The oldest fossils of Sciadopitys are from the Late Cretaceous of Japan, and the genus was widespread in Laurasia during most of the Cenozoic, especially in Europe until the Pliocene. The genus existed in the present-day United States as recently as the Pliocene.
