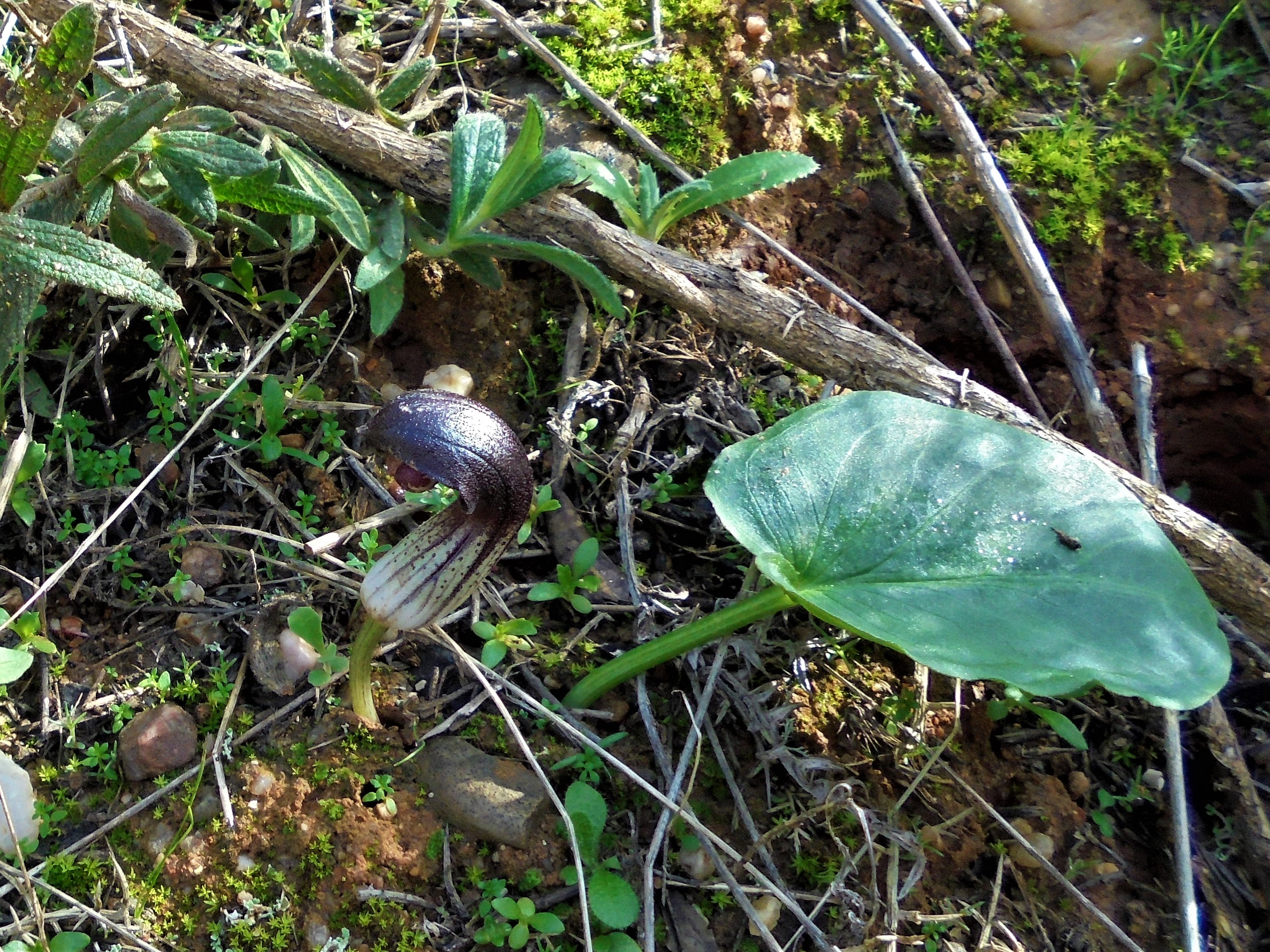
- Arisarum simorrhinum at Serras de Aire e Candeeiros

Conservation status
- Least Concern (IUCN 3.1)

Scientific classification
- Kingdom: Plantae
- Clade: Tracheophytes
- Clade: Angiosperms
- Clade: Monocots
- Order: Alismatales
- Family: Araceae
- Genus: Arisarum
- Species: A. simorrhinum

Binomial name
- Arisarum simorrhinum Durieu

Synonyms
- Arisarum tingitanum Schott; Arisarum vulgare subsp. simorrhinum (Durieu) Maire & Weiller

= Arisarum simorrhinum =

Species of flowering plant

Arisarum simorrhinum is species of flowering plant of the family Araceae. It is native to the western Mediterranean Basin (Iberian Peninsula and northwest Maghreb).

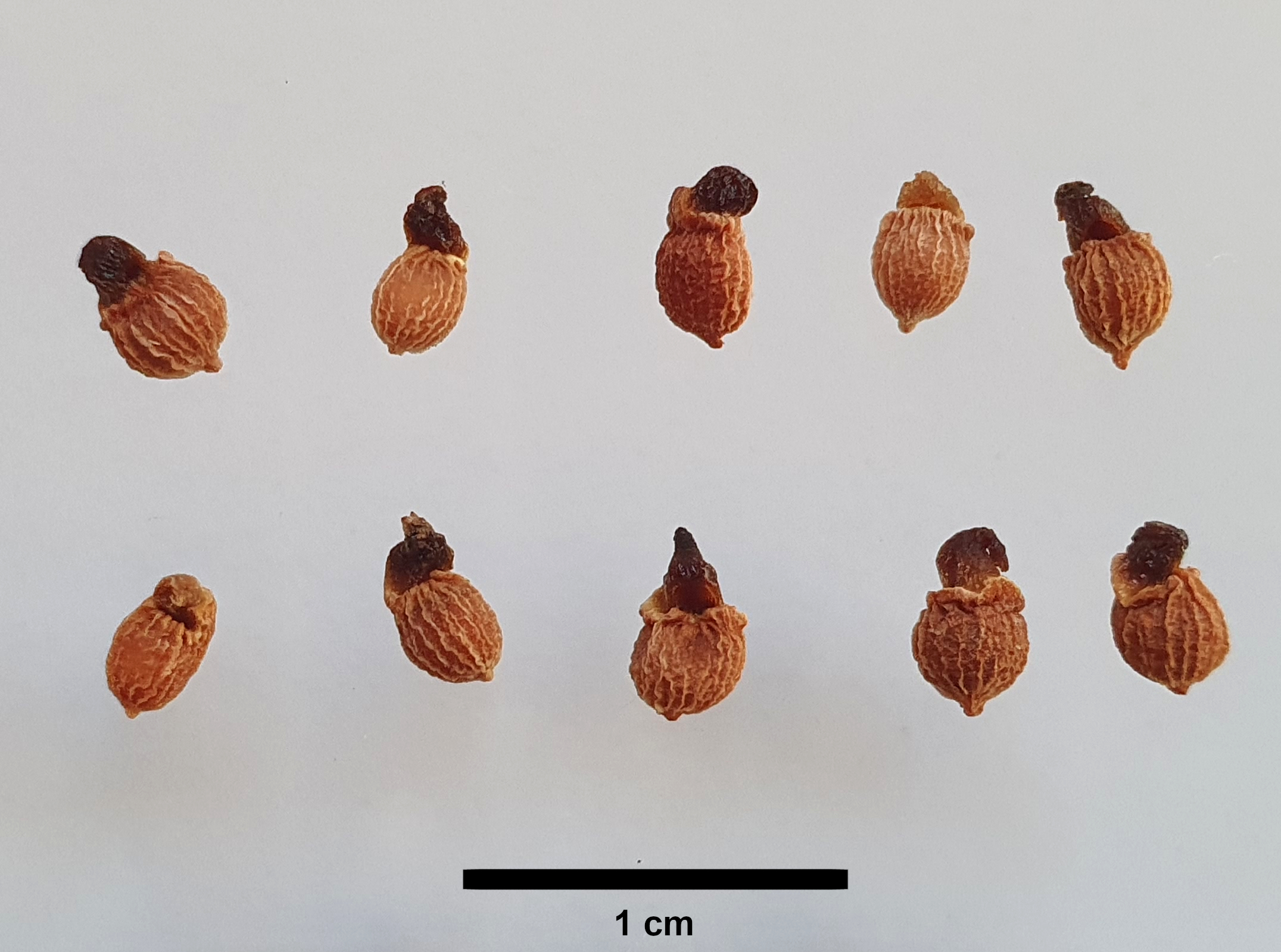
Seeds of Arisarum simorrhinum Durieu

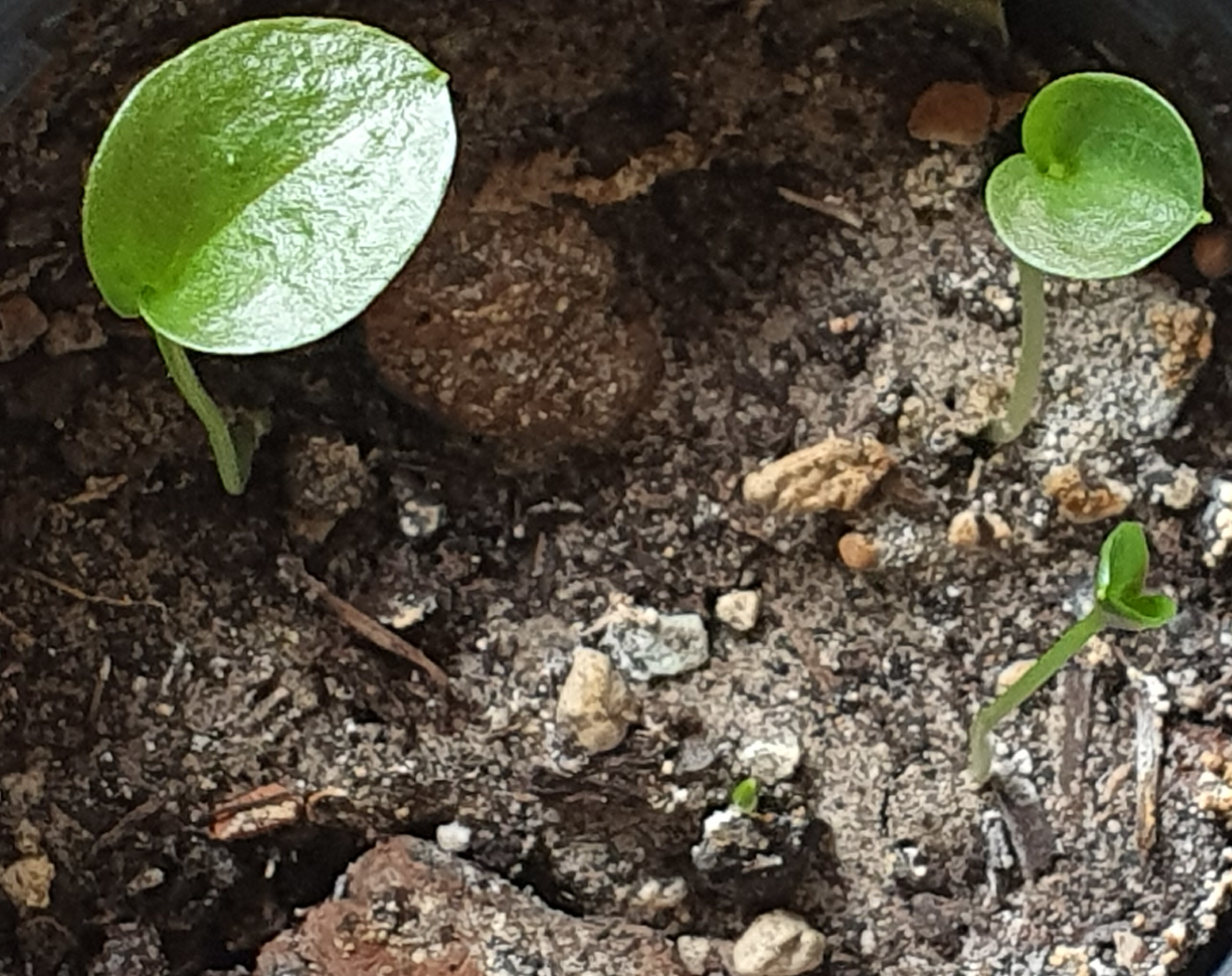
Seedlings of Arisarum simorrhinum Durieu

== Description ==
Arisarum simorrhinum is a perennial plant, up to 30 centimetres (12 in) or 15–40 centimetres (5.9–15.7 in) in height, with the inflorescence being usually shorter than the leaves and with a peduncle stained with purple. The spadix, a rod-like structure bearing the individual flowers, is protected by a special bract (the spathe) shaped as a tube of 3–1.5 centimetres (1.18–0.59 in), wide at the bottom, with purple spotting, and curved upper part, in the shape of a helmet tilted forward. It has sagittate leaves, with a long petiole.

It has no stems, the leaves arise directly from a tuber of 1–4.5 by 0.6–3.5 centimetres (0.39 in–1.77 in × 0.24 in–1.38 in), from which rhizomes develop up to 9 by 1.5 centimetres (3.54 in × 0.59 in) and roots up to 9 centimetres (3.5 in). It has cordate to hastate-sagittate-shaped leaves, with petioles of 5–34 by 0.1–0.9 centimetres (1.969 in–13.386 in × 0.039 in–0.354 in), sometimes with small purple spots, winged from the base; the lamina (leaf blade) is 5–12 by 3.5–10 centimetres (2.0 in–4.7 in × 1.4 in–3.9 in), its base is cordate to hastate in shape with acute to rounded lobes 0.5–5.9 by 0.5–4 centimetres (0.20 in–2.32 in × 0.20 in–1.57 in).

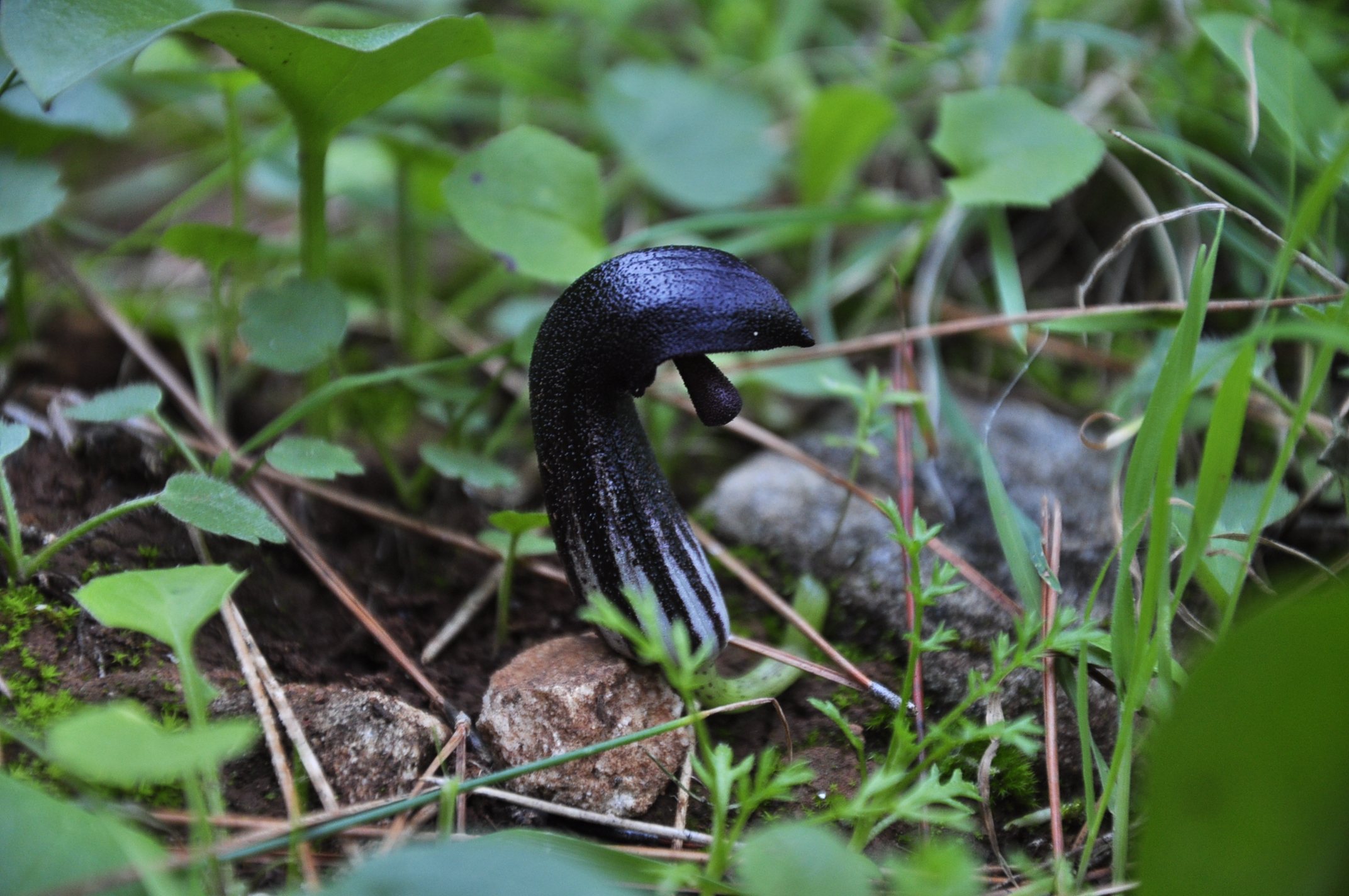
Arisarum simorrhinum at Sierra de Mijas

Inflorescence is 0.7–2 by 1–2.4 centimetres (0.28 in–0.79 in × 0.39 in–0.94 in) with a stalk of 4–22.6 by 0.1–0.6 centimetres (1.575 in–8.898 in × 0.039 in–0.236 in), generally flexible and thin; upright spathe with the margins of the bottom joined together forming a closed tube with 2–6 centimetres (0.79–2.36 in) that ends in the form of a hood, smooth or papillary at the margin, with longitudinal nerve, purple in the apex becoming progressively less pigmented and paler towards the base. The spadix has a sterile terminal part, arched in the upper half and unequal to the lower part, and is situated within the spathe.

Fruit is composed of multiple berries (2-8), greenish and not very fleshy, 5–15 by 5–14 millimetres (0.20 in–0.59 in × 0.20 in–0.55 in) and 1 to 12 seeds per berry.

== Distribution and habitat ==
Arisarum simorrhinum is native to most of Portugal, western Spain, Morocco and northwestern Algeria. It is a nitrophile and occurs on acidic and basic soils often on disturbed ground and on sandy soils in pasture, clearings in scrub and woodland, on road sides and ditch margins, cultivated land and among rocky outcrops from sea level up to 840 metres (2,760 ft) in altitude. Records from the Canary Islands, Balearic Islands, Madeira and Tunisia are erroneous due to taxonomic confusion with A. vulgare subsp. subexsertum.
