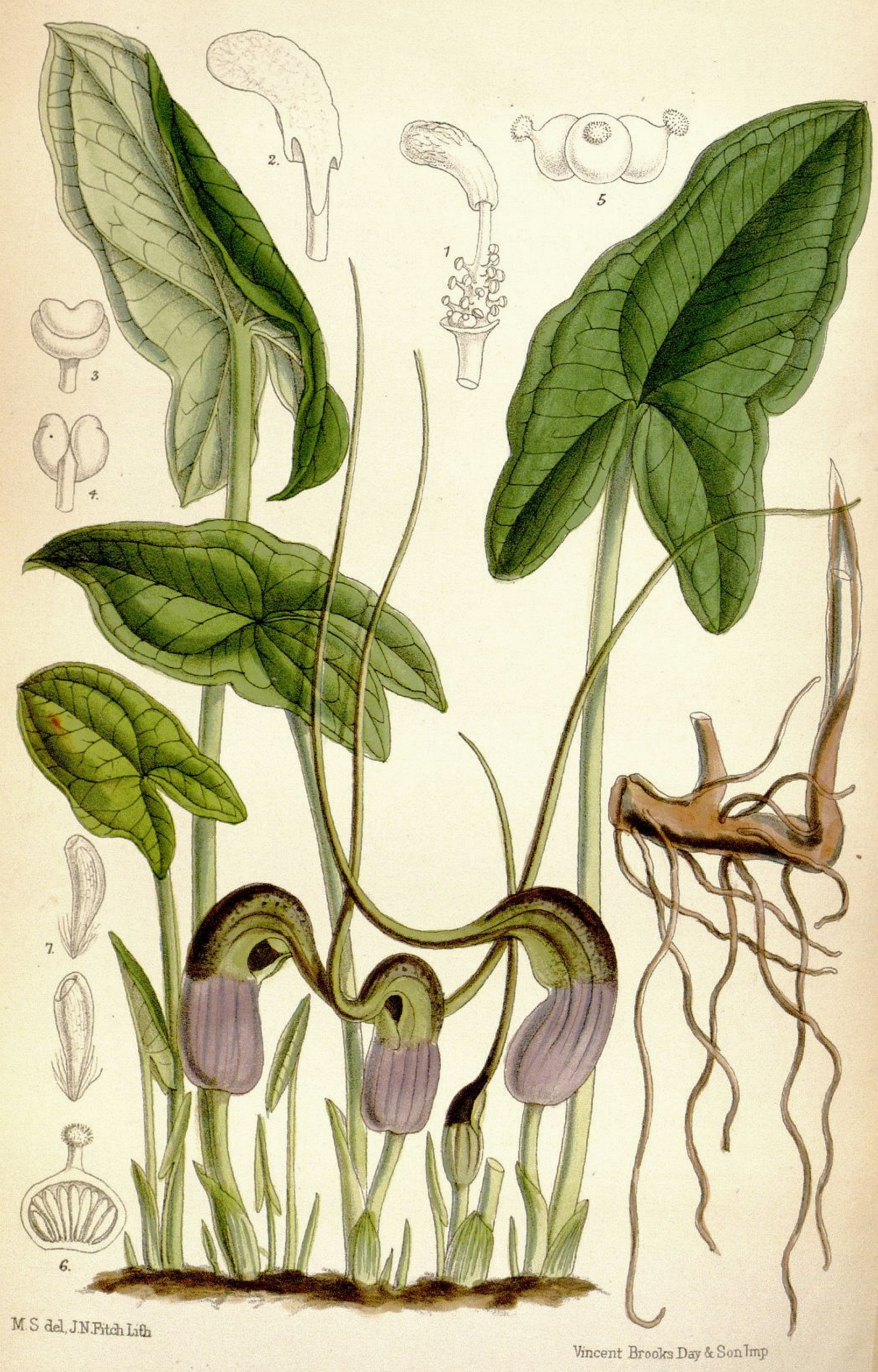
- Botanical illustration of Arisarum proboscideum
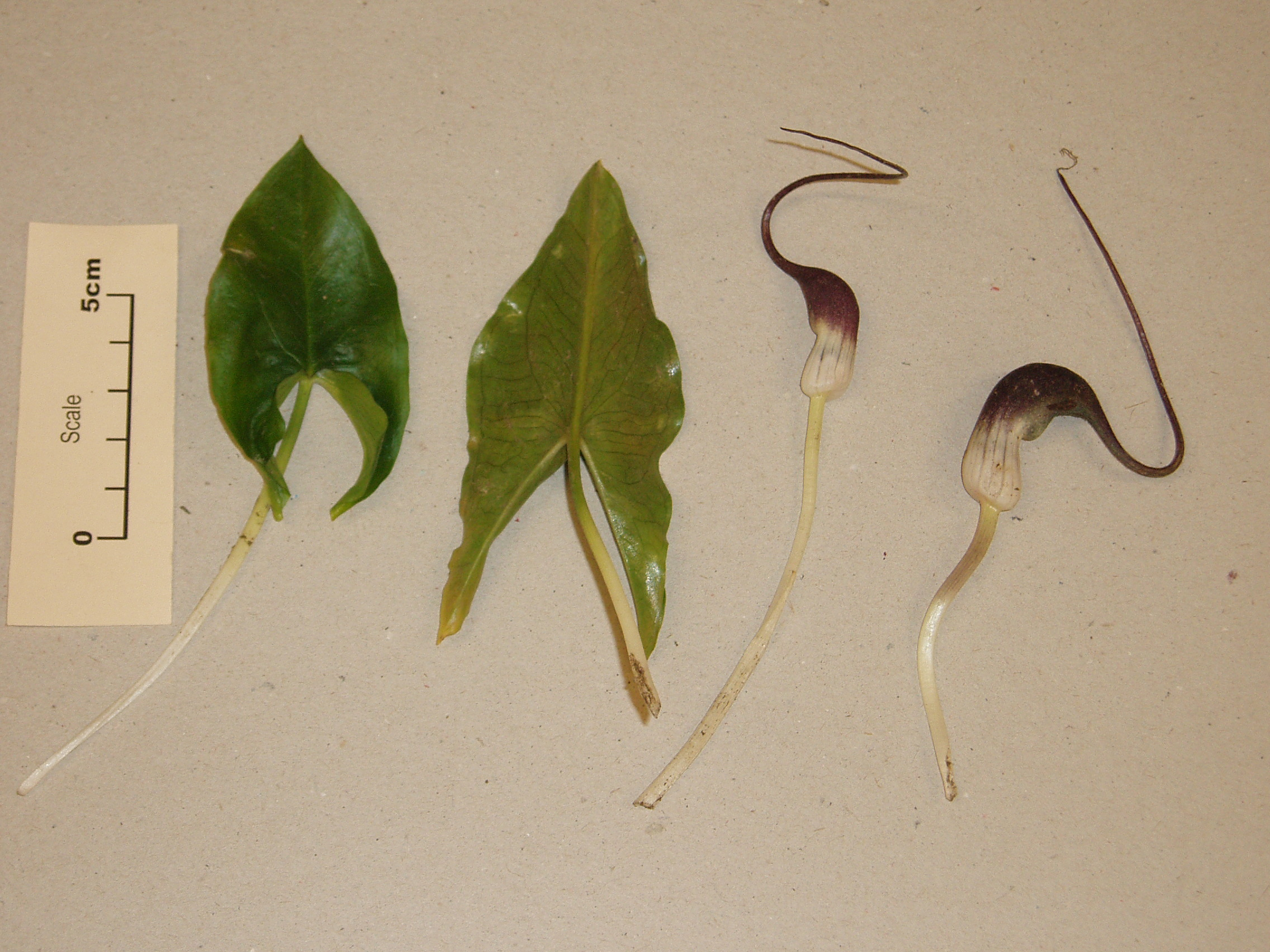
- Leaves and inflorescences of Arisarum proboscideum with a scale bar

Conservation status
- Least Concern (IUCN 3.1)

Scientific classification
- Kingdom: Plantae
- Clade: Tracheophytes
- Clade: Angiosperms
- Clade: Monocots
- Order: Alismatales
- Family: Araceae
- Genus: Arisarum
- Species: A. proboscideum

Binomial name
- Arisarum proboscideum (L.) Savi

Synonyms
- Arum proboscideum L.; Homaida proboscidea (L.) Raf.

= Arisarum proboscideum =

Species of flowering plant

Arisarum proboscideum, also known as the mouse plant or mouse-tail plant, is a flowering plant in the family Araceae.

== Description ==
Arisarum proboscideum is a herbaceous perennial plant. This species has a short and slender rhizome. Leaves are green and range from 6 – 15 cm long. The leaves are either sagittate, obtuse or mucronate in leaf structure. A. proboscideum possesses a spathe up to 10 cm long and an inflorescent spadix. Plants are monoecious, with usually one to three female flowers and up to sixteen male. Larger inflorescences also contain disproportionally more male flowers than female flowers. Pollination is performed by insects such as fungus gnats, which are lured into the spathe through a small opening. Once the insect is inside they are trapped and must struggle to escape. The struggling insect transfers pollen from male to female flowers.

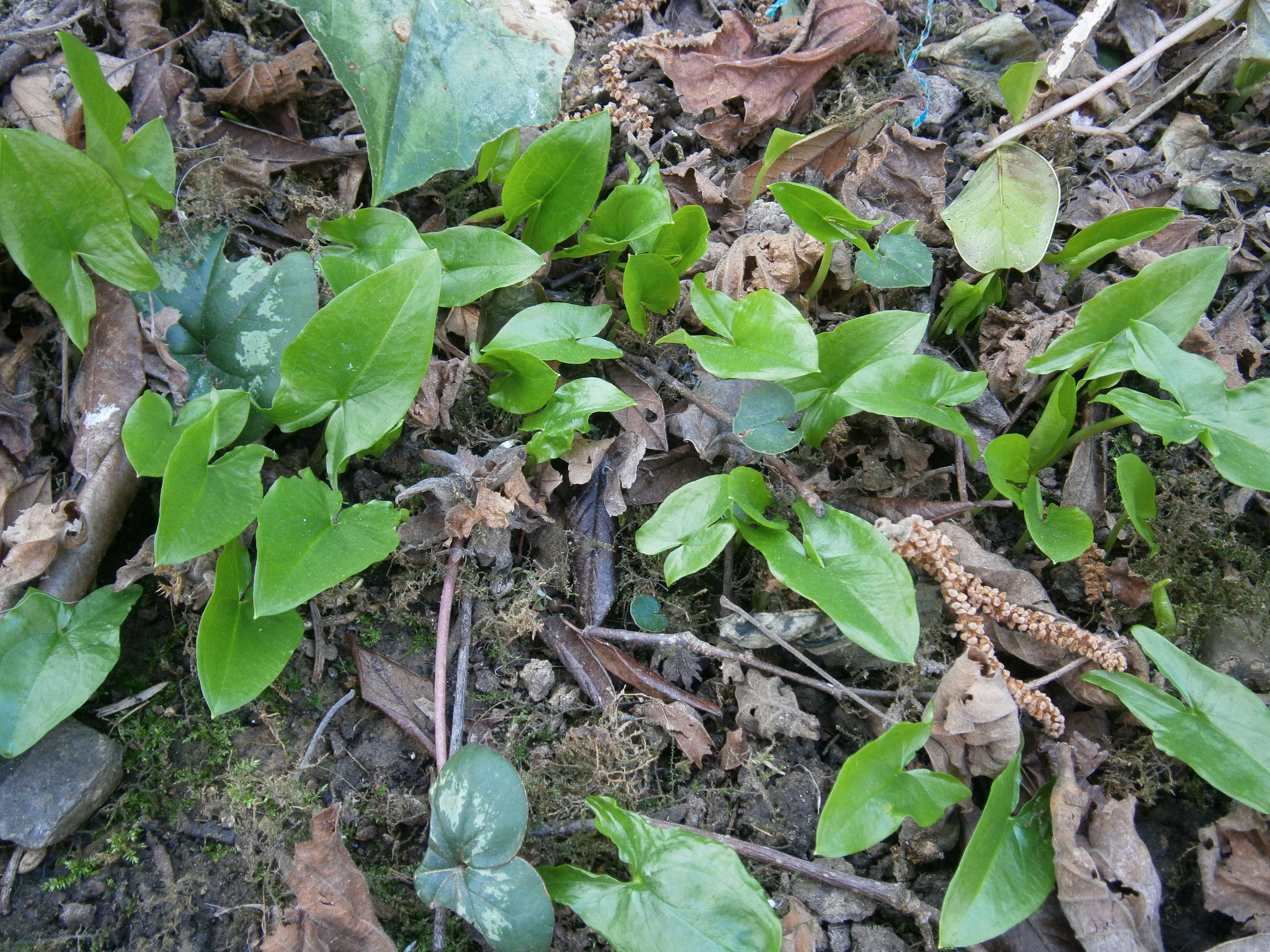
Leaves

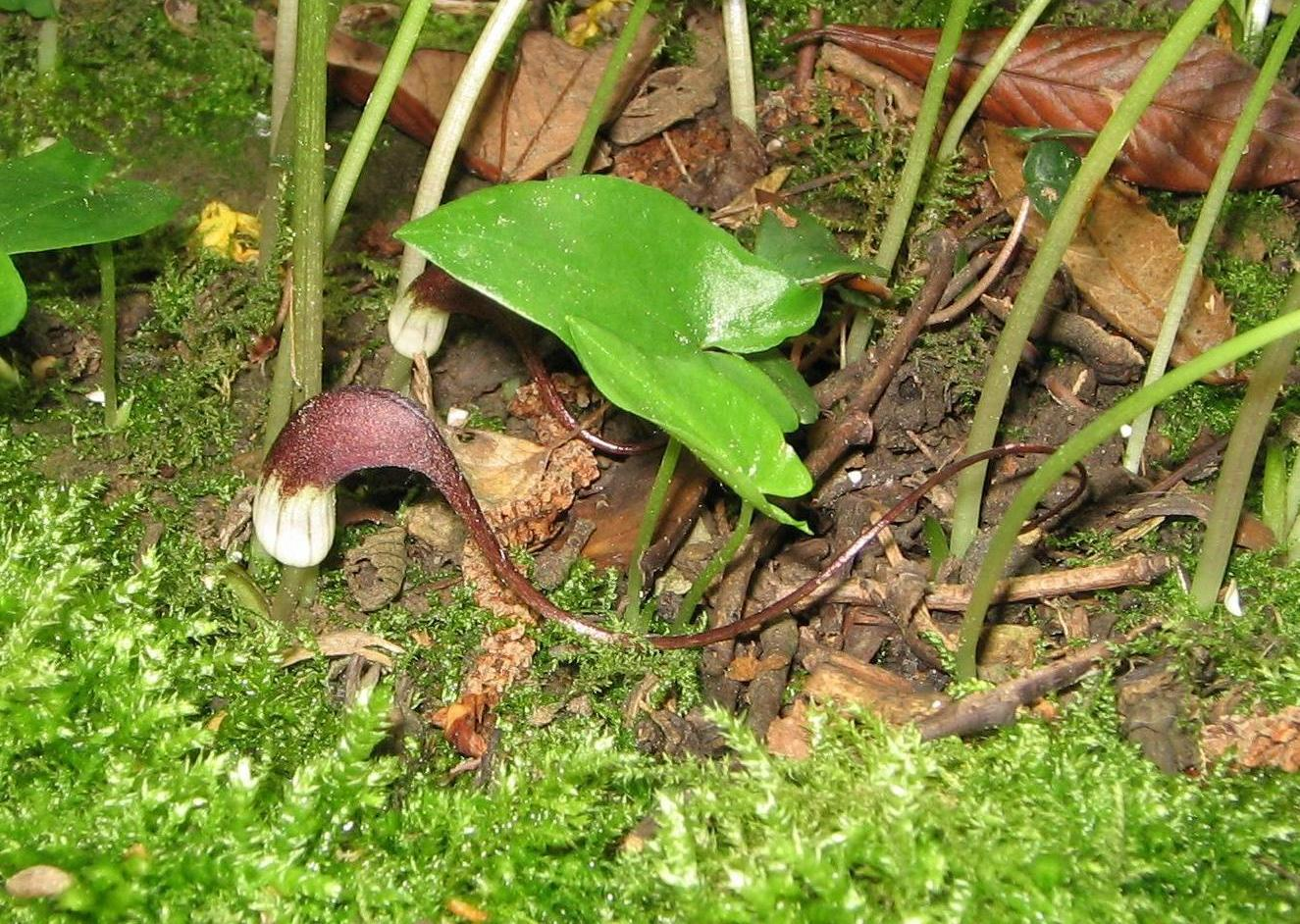
Leaf and spathe

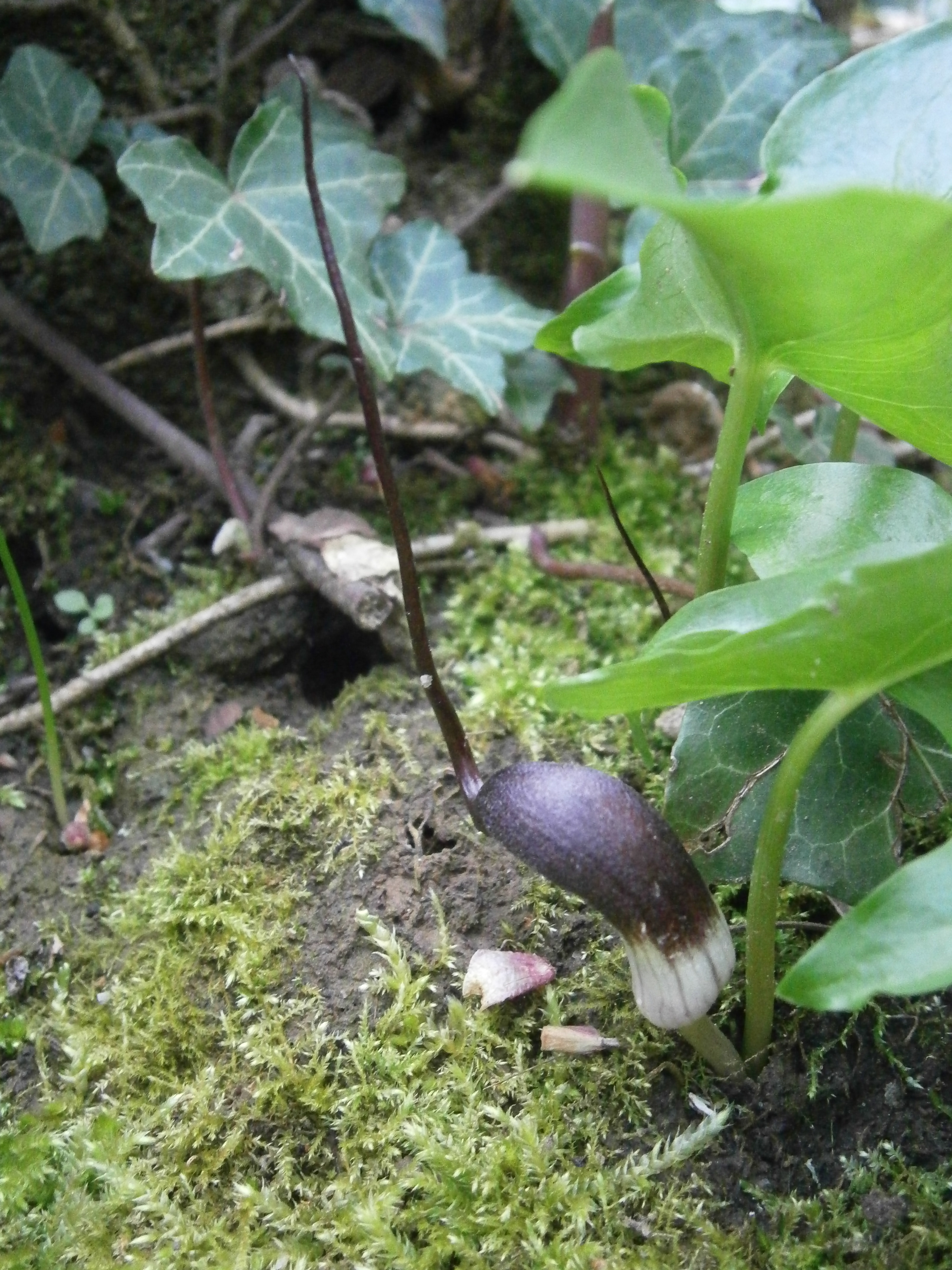
Close-up spathe

== Distribution ==
This species is native Europe, where it can be found in western Spain and both central and southern Italy.

Arisarum proboscideum has been introduced outside of its natural range into the United Kingdom, New Zealand and North America.

== Habitat ==
Arisarum proboscideum grows in shaded forest habitats. In Italy it inhabits humid, Mediterranean woodlands where it grows in nutrient rich soils. In Spain this species also inhabits warmer and drier temperate forests.

It is naturally found at elevations up to 1200 metres above sea level.

== Ecology ==
=== Pollination ===
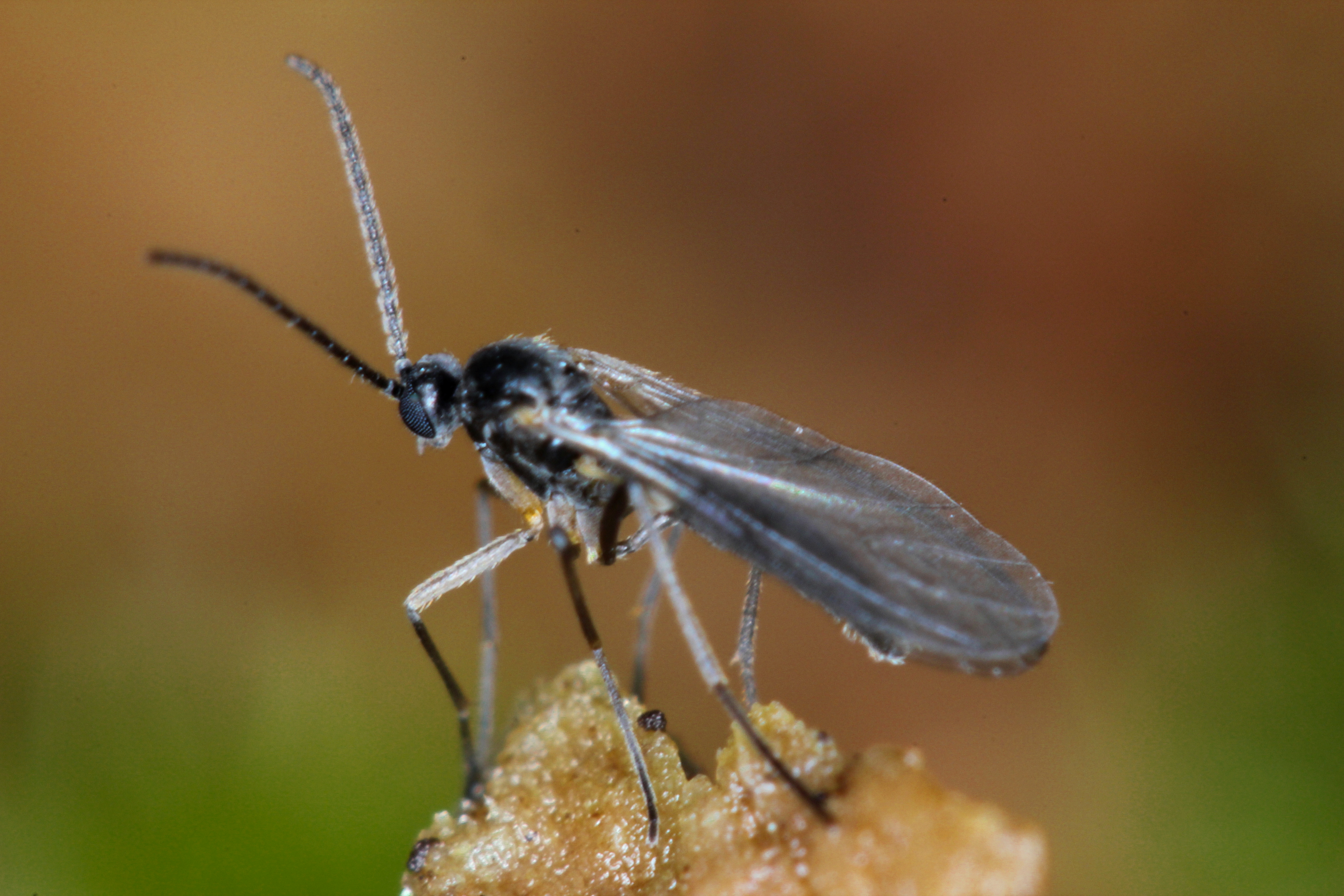
Arisarum proboscideum is pollinated by fungus gnats

The inflorescence mimics mushrooms. They are pollinated by fungus gnats.

=== Parasite ecology ===
Arisarum proboscideum is a host plant of the phytopathogenic fungus Melanustilospora arisari. It causes black, round spotting of up to 1 cm in size.

== Cytology ==
=== Chromosome count ===
The diploid chromosome count is 2n=28.

=== Chloroplasts ===
The chloroplasts of Arisarum proboscideum have unusual protrusions.

== Horticulture ==
It can be cultivated outdoors in shaded areas, and it is not suitable for warm greenhouses exposed to the summer sun, as the rhizomes are intolerant of desiccation. They require sufficient moisture. Planting and re-planting is advised to take place in springtime.
