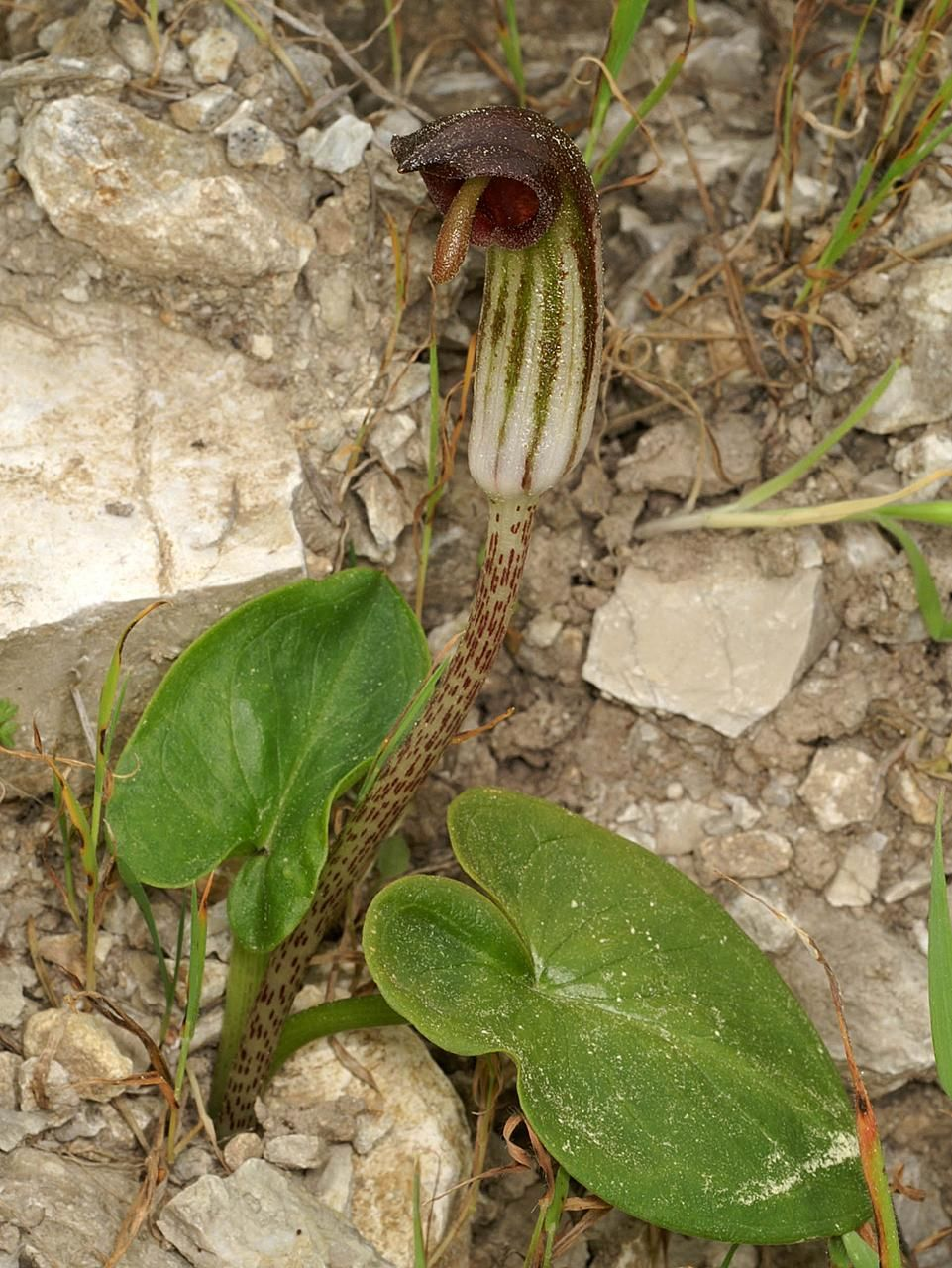
- Arisarum vulgare

Scientific classification
- Kingdom: Plantae
- Clade: Tracheophytes
- Clade: Angiosperms
- Clade: Monocots
- Order: Alismatales
- Family: Araceae
- Subfamily: Aroideae
- Tribe: Arisareae
- Genus: Arisarum; Mill.

Synonyms
- Balmisa Lag.

= Arisarum =

Arisarum Temporal range: 46.1 –0 Ma Middle Eocene – Recent

Genus of flowering plants

Arisarum is a genus of flowering plants in the family Araceae. It is native to the Mediterranean region, east to the Caucasus and west to Macaronesia.

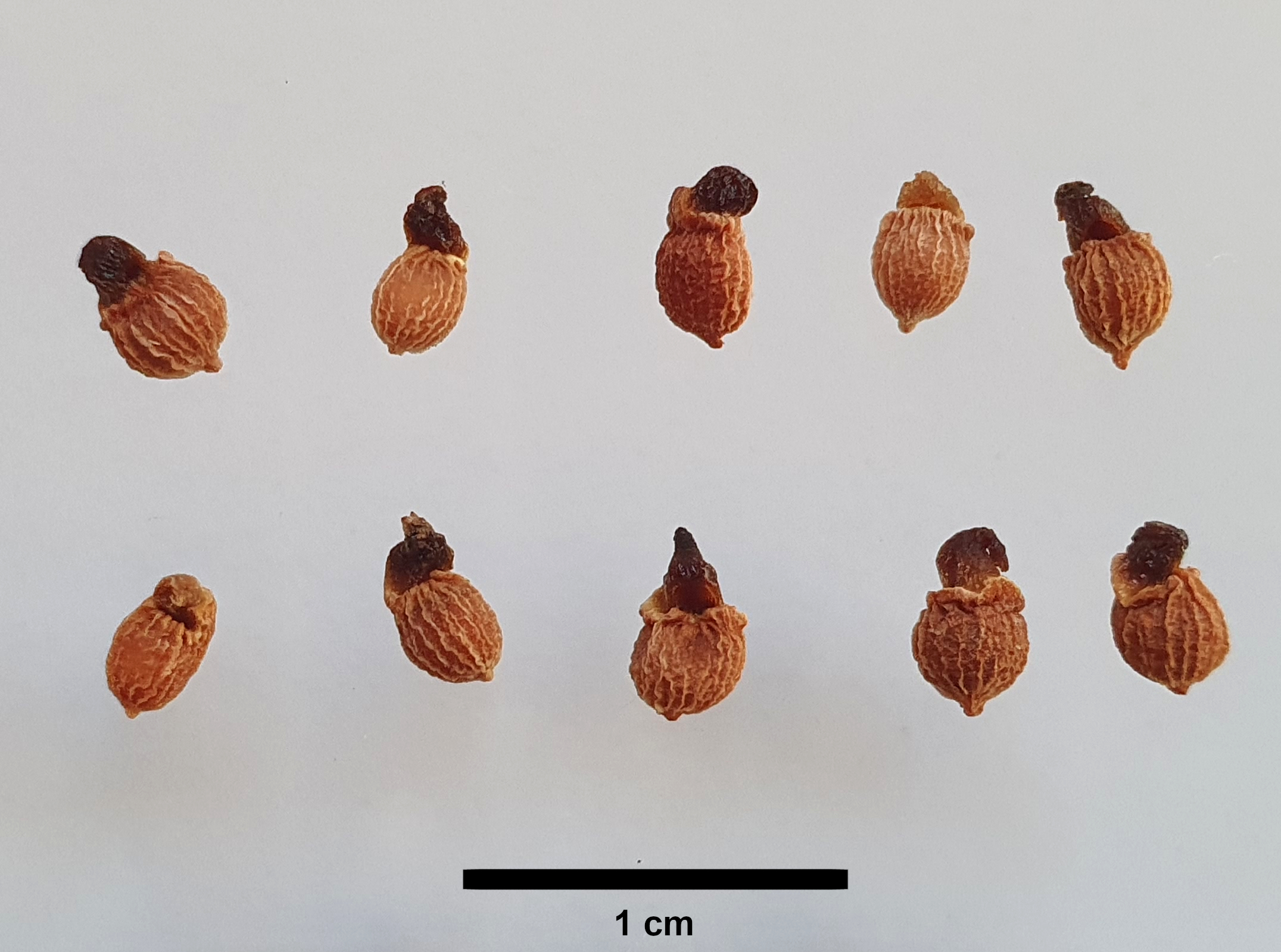
Seeds of Arisarum simorrhinum Durieu

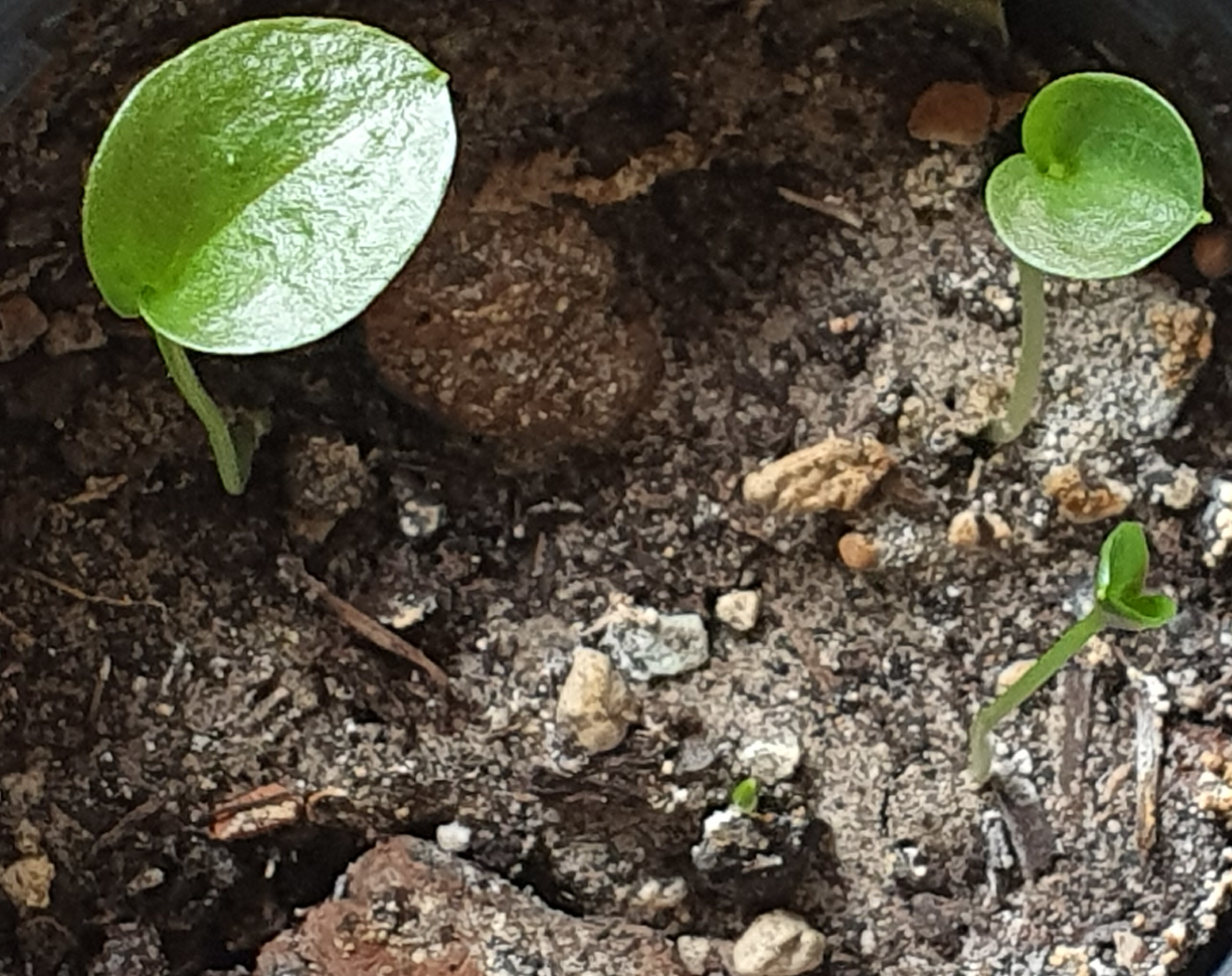
Seedlings of Arisarum simorrhinum Durieu

== Taxonomy ==
=== Species ===
Accepted species:

Image	Scientific name	Distribution
	Arisarum simorrhinum Durieu	Portugal Spain, Balearic Islands, Algeria, Morocco
	Arisarum proboscideum (L.) Savi	Spain, Italy
	Arisarum vulgare O.Targ.Tozz.	Mediterranean region of northern Africa and southern Europe from Portugal and Morocco to Turkey and Israel; Caucasus; Canary Islands, Madeira, Azores

=== Natural Hybrids ===
1. Arisarum × aspergillum Dunal - Spain, Algeria, Morocco (A. simorrhinum × A. vulgare)

== Phylogeny ==
It is closely related to the genera Ambrosina, Peltandra, and Typhonodorum. Ambrosina is the sister group to Arisarum, from which it separated about 46.1 Million years ago.

The precise relationships are displayed in the following cladogram:

- - - Ambrosineae
      Ambrosina
    - Arisareae
      Arisarum
  - Peltandreae
    - Typhonodorum
    - Peltandra

== Description ==
In A. simorrhinum, the flower stalk is shorter or equal in length to the leaf stalk, whereas in A. vulgare, the flower stalk is longer than the leaf stalk. A. vulgare also has a generally longer spadix than A. simorrhinum.

== Ecology ==
=== Parasite ecology ===
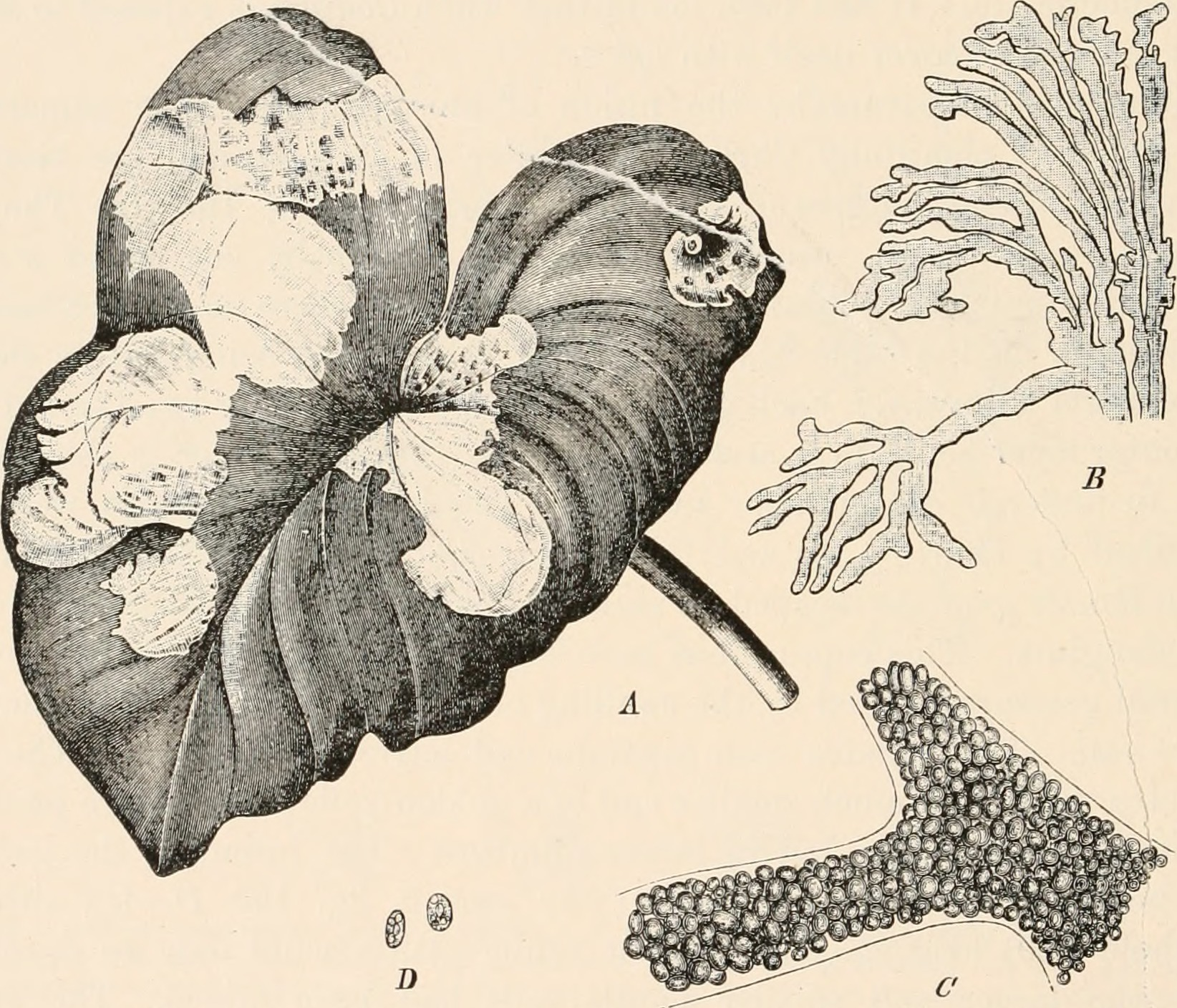
Illustration of the phytopathogenic green algae Phyllosiphon arisari, which affects the foliage of Arisarum

Arisarum foliage is parasitized by the siphonous green algae Phyllosiphon arisari Kühn. It induces necrosis in leaf tissue, after invading the intracellular space. The foliage also may be affected by two species of fungi, namely Phyllosticta arisari and Melanustilospora arisari. The scale insect Icerya purchasi also feeds on Arisarum.
