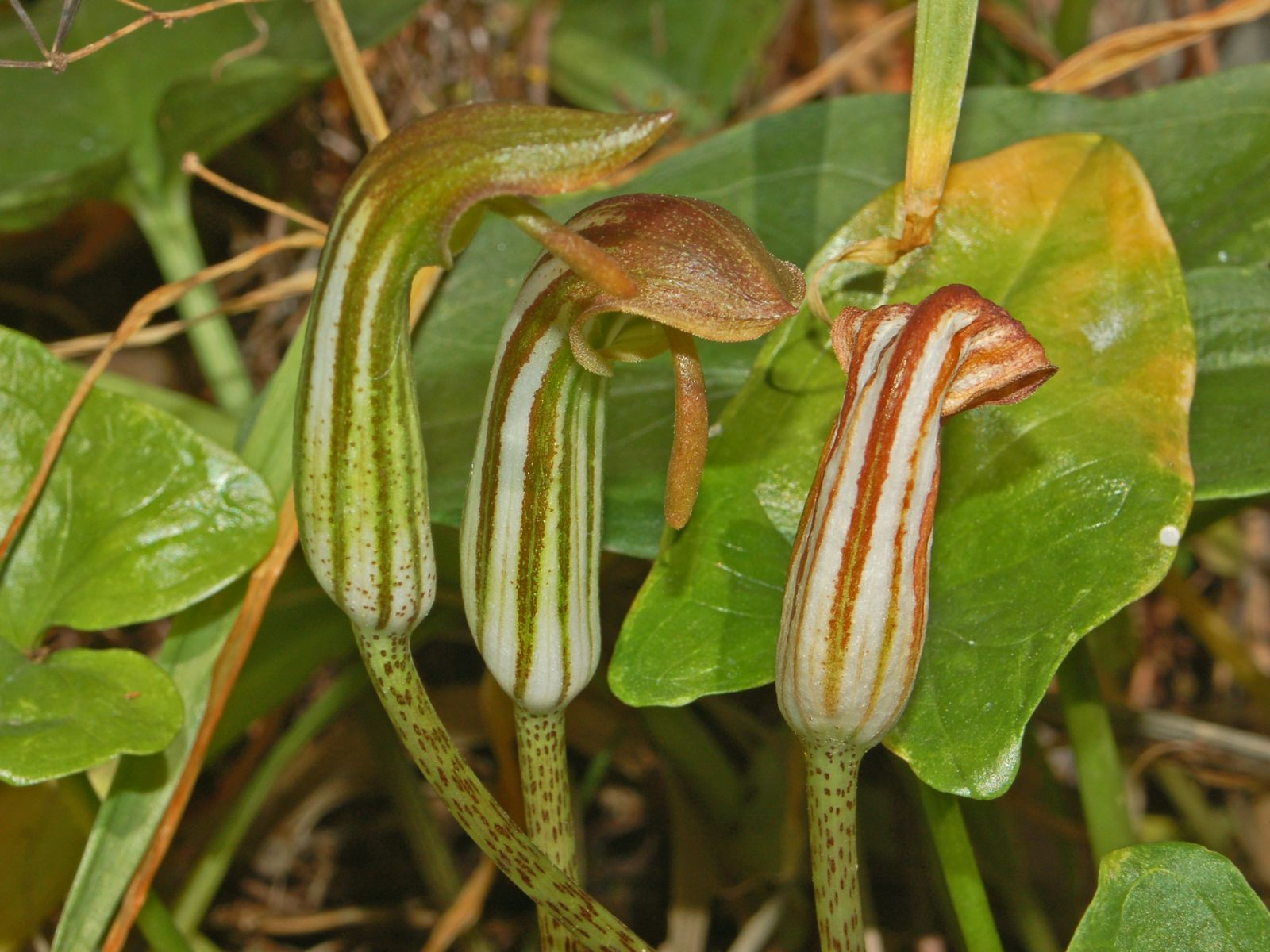
- Inflorescences of Arisarum vulgare

Scientific classification
- Kingdom: Plantae
- Clade: Tracheophytes
- Clade: Angiosperms
- Clade: Monocots
- Order: Alismatales
- Family: Araceae
- Genus: Arisarum
- Species: A. vulgare

Binomial name
- Arisarum vulgare Targ.Tozz.

= Arisarum vulgare =

Species of flowering plant

Arisarum vulgare, common name the friar's cowl or larus, is an herbaceous, perennial, rhizomatous plant in the genus Arisarum belonging to the family Araceae.

== Description ==
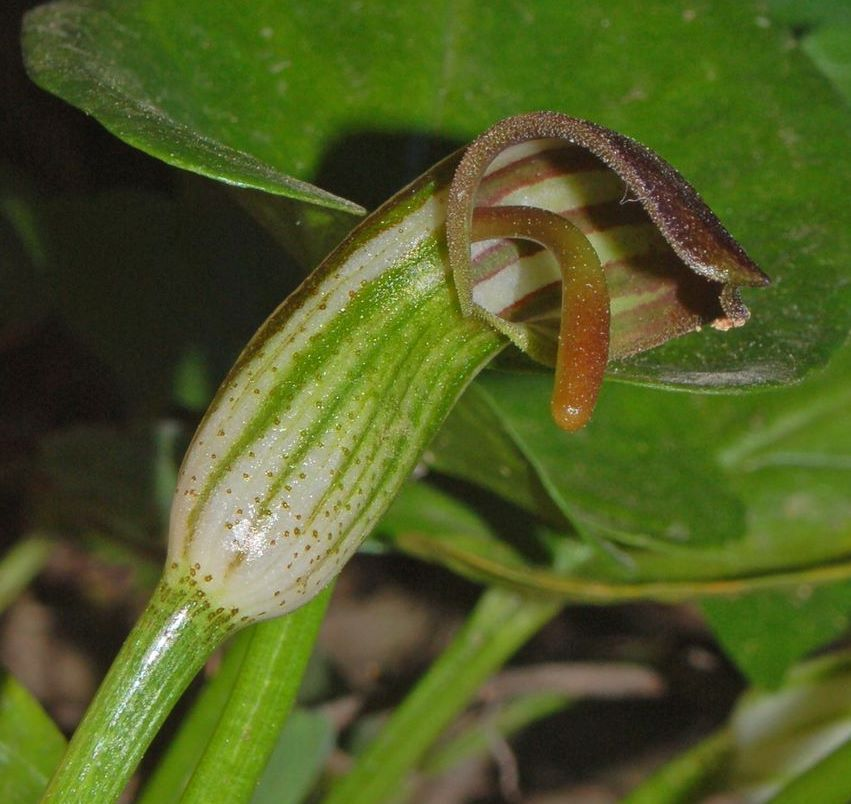
Close-up on Arisarum vulgare

Arisarum vulgare reaches on average 10–30 centimetres (3.9–11.8 in) of height. The leaves of this geophyte plant are basal only, wide, ovate to arrow-shaped, with a petiole 12–15 centimetres (4.7–5.9 in) long. The stems are erect and unbranched, usually mottled and grow directly from the underground rhizome. A single leaflike bract (spathe) forms a purplish-brown or olive green striped tube about 5 inches long, with an open upper part helmet or hood-shaped curved forward. It encloses a fleshy greenish clublike spike (spadix) bent forward, protruding from the tube and bearing at the bottom minute purple violet flowers. The 20 male flowers are located above the four to six female, with sterile flowers completely missing. The flowering period extends from October through May. The sexes are united in the same individual plant. Pollination is granted by insects (entomophily). The fruits are greenish berries of about 1 centimetre (0.39 in)long.

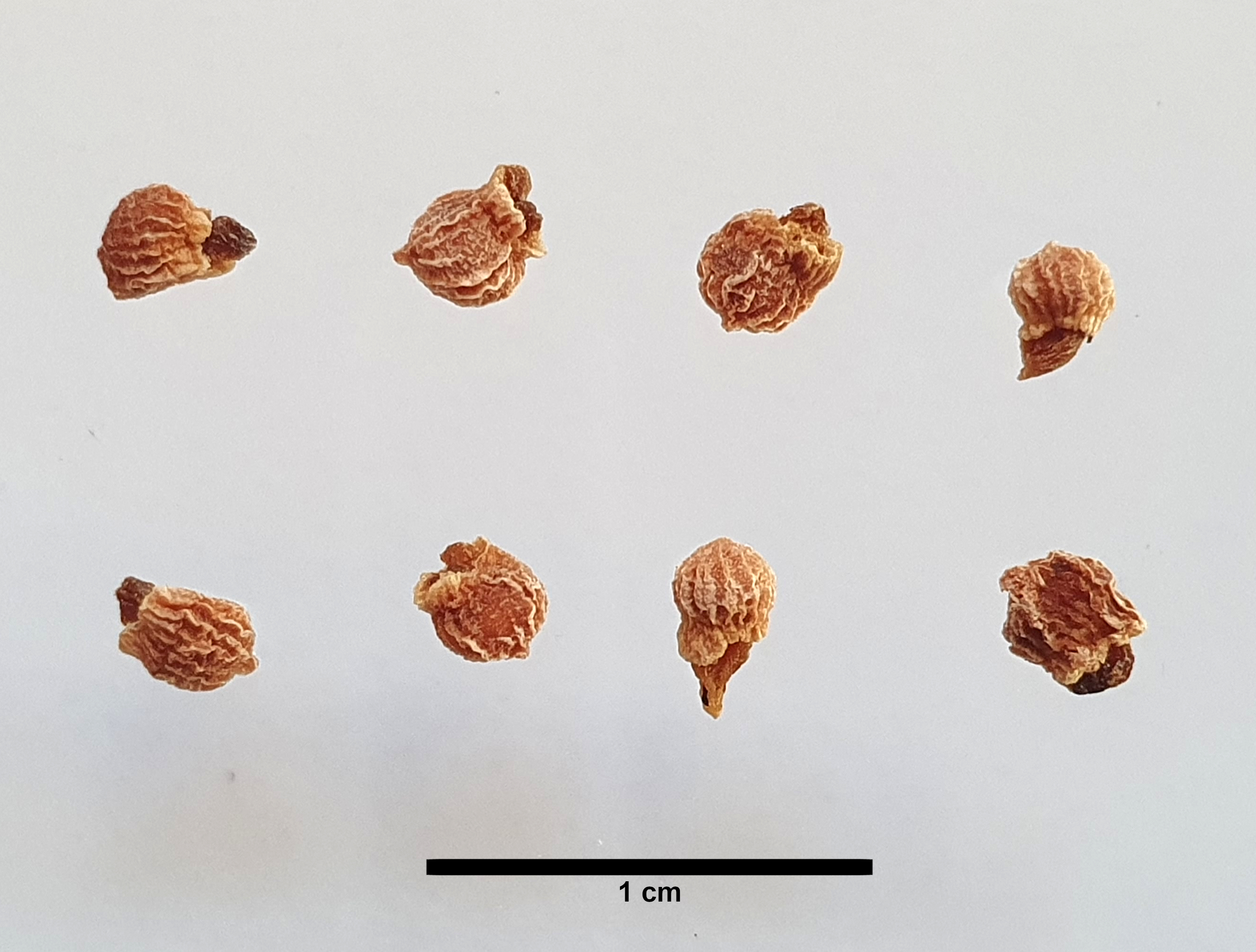
Seeds of Arisarum vulgare O.Targ.Tozz.

== Distribution ==
Arisarum vulgare is native to the Mediterranean Basin, from the Caucasus in the east to the southeastern Iberian Peninsula in the west, where it introgresses with Arisarum simorrhinum.

== Habitat ==
Arisarum vulgare prefers grassy fields and rocky scrubland, forests and wasteland, mainly in shady and cool places and in moist soils, at an altitude of 0–800 metres (0–2,625 ft) above sea level.

== Subspecies ==
The main described subspecies are the following:

- Arisarum vulgare O.Targ.Tozz. subsp. vulgare (above described)
- Arisarum vulgare O.Targ.Tozz. subsp. simorrhinum (Durieu) Maire & Weiller

In Arisarum vulgare subsp. simorrhinum the flower stem is much shorter than the petioles. Bract and spadix are erect. The latter is thickened at the tip.

== Gallery ==
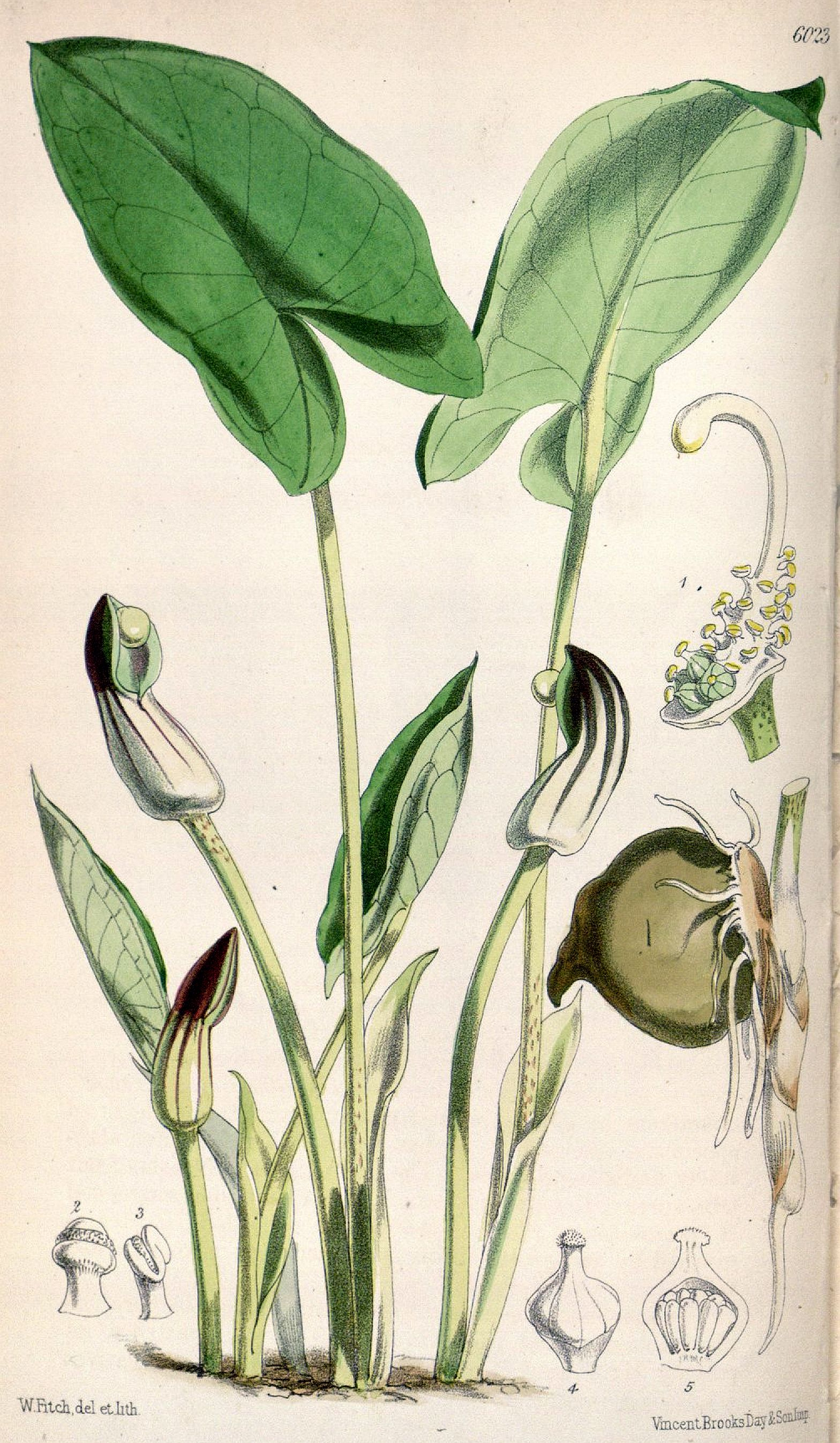
Botanical drawing of Arisarum vulgare, Curtis's Botanical Magazine (1873)

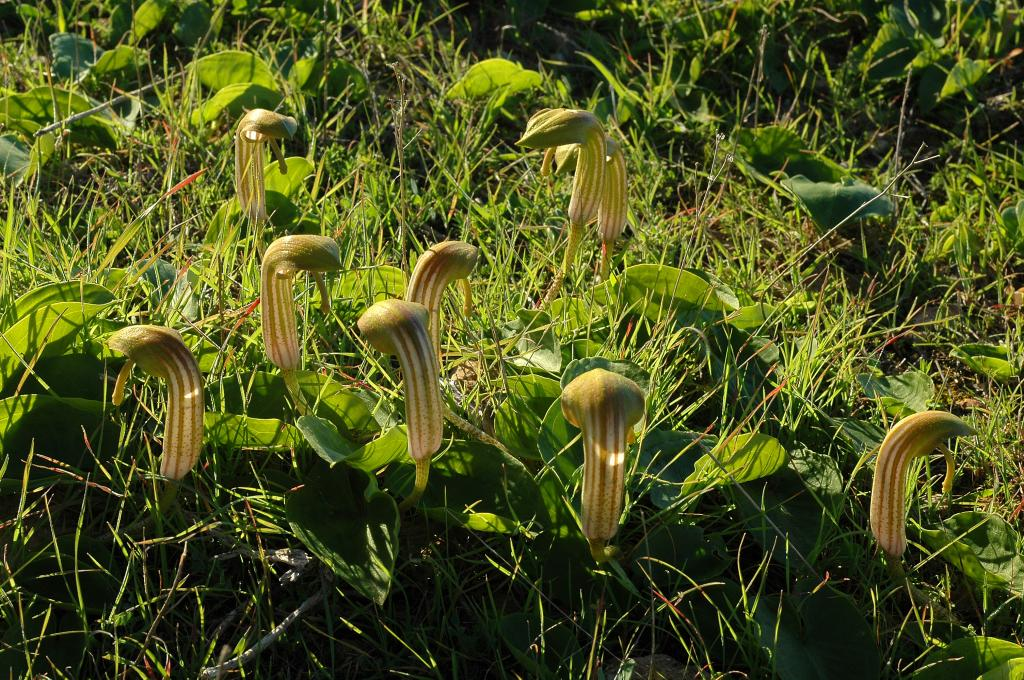
Plants of Arisarum vulgare

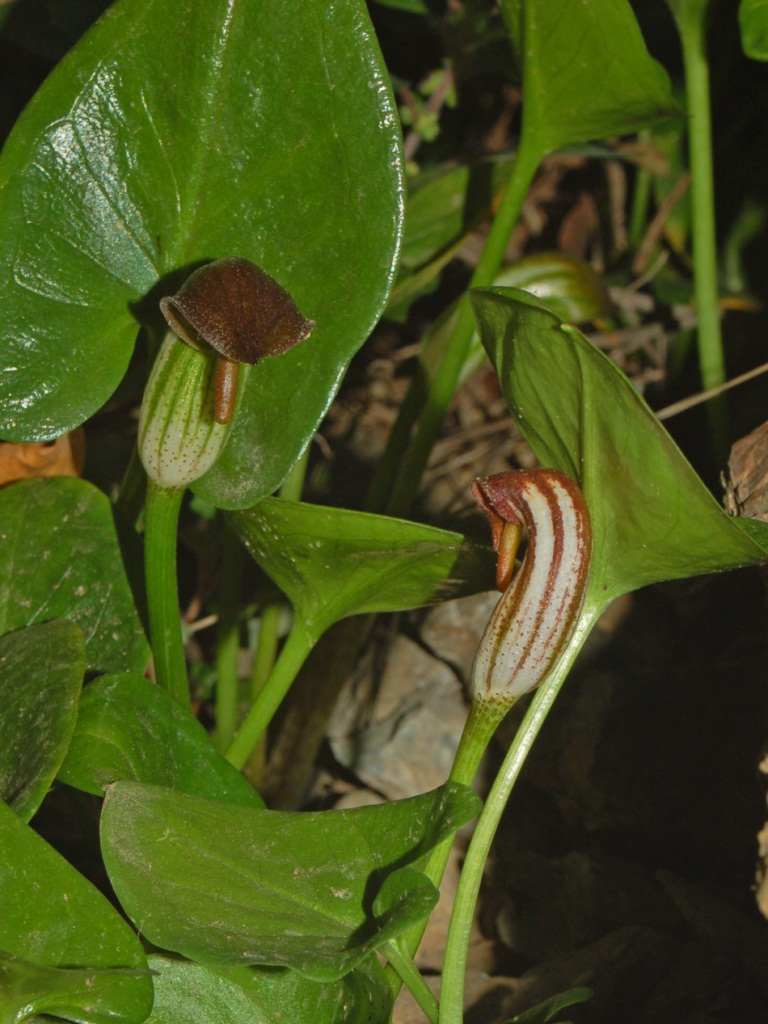
Plants of Arisarum vulgare

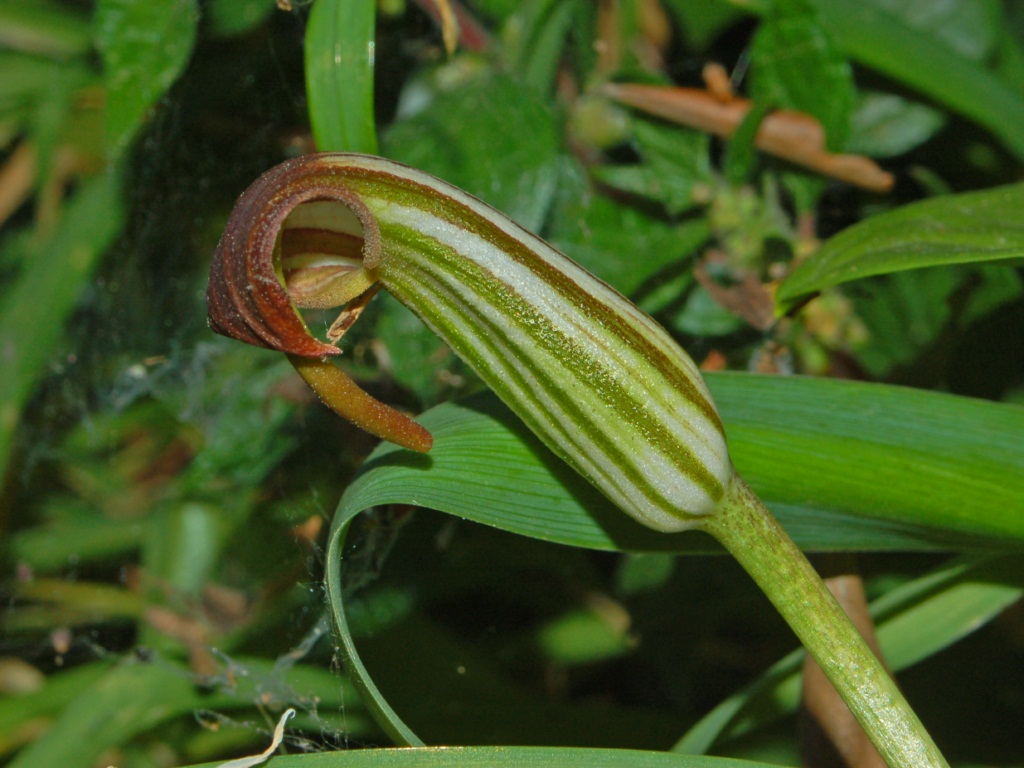
Close-up on Arisarum vulgare

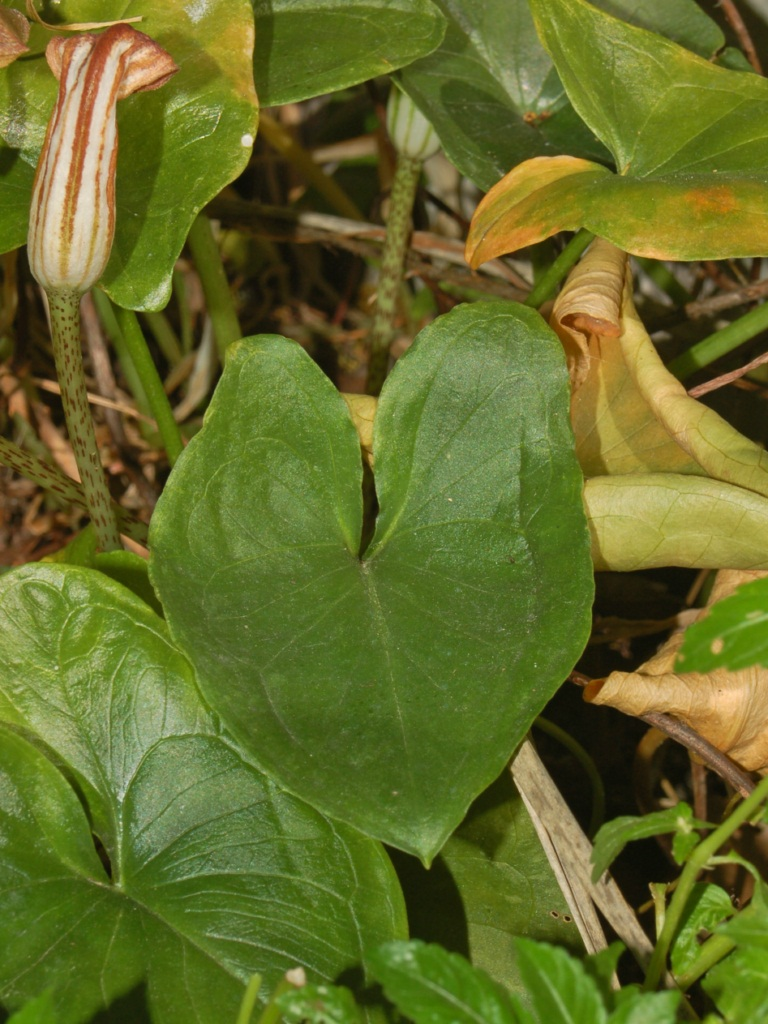
Leaf of Arisarum vulgare

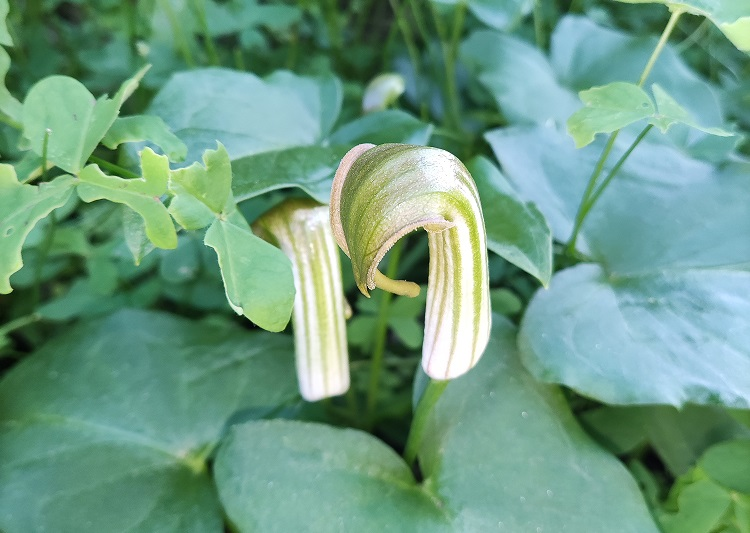
Young Arisarum vulgare

== Synonyms ==
- Arisarum arisarum (L.) Huth
- Arisarum australe Rich.
- Arisarum azoricum Schott
- Arisarum balansae Schott
- Arisarum crassifolium Schott
- Arisarum forbesii Schott
- Arisarum incurvatum Holmboe
- Arisarum jacquinii Schott
- Arisarum latifolium Bubani
- Arisarum latifolium Hill
- Arisarum libani Schott
- Arisarum serpentrium Raf.
- Arisarum sibthorpii Schott
- Arisarum subalpinum Kotschy ex Engl.
- Arisarum veslingii Schott
- Arum arisarum L.
- Arum arisarum Lour.
- Arum calyptrale Salisb.
- Arum incurvatum Lam.
- Arum libani Schott
- Balmisa vulgaris (Targ.Tozz.) Lag.
- Calyptrocoryne cochinchinensis (Blume) Schott
- Typhonium cochinchinense Blume
