= Giovanni Targioni Tozzetti =

Italian naturalist

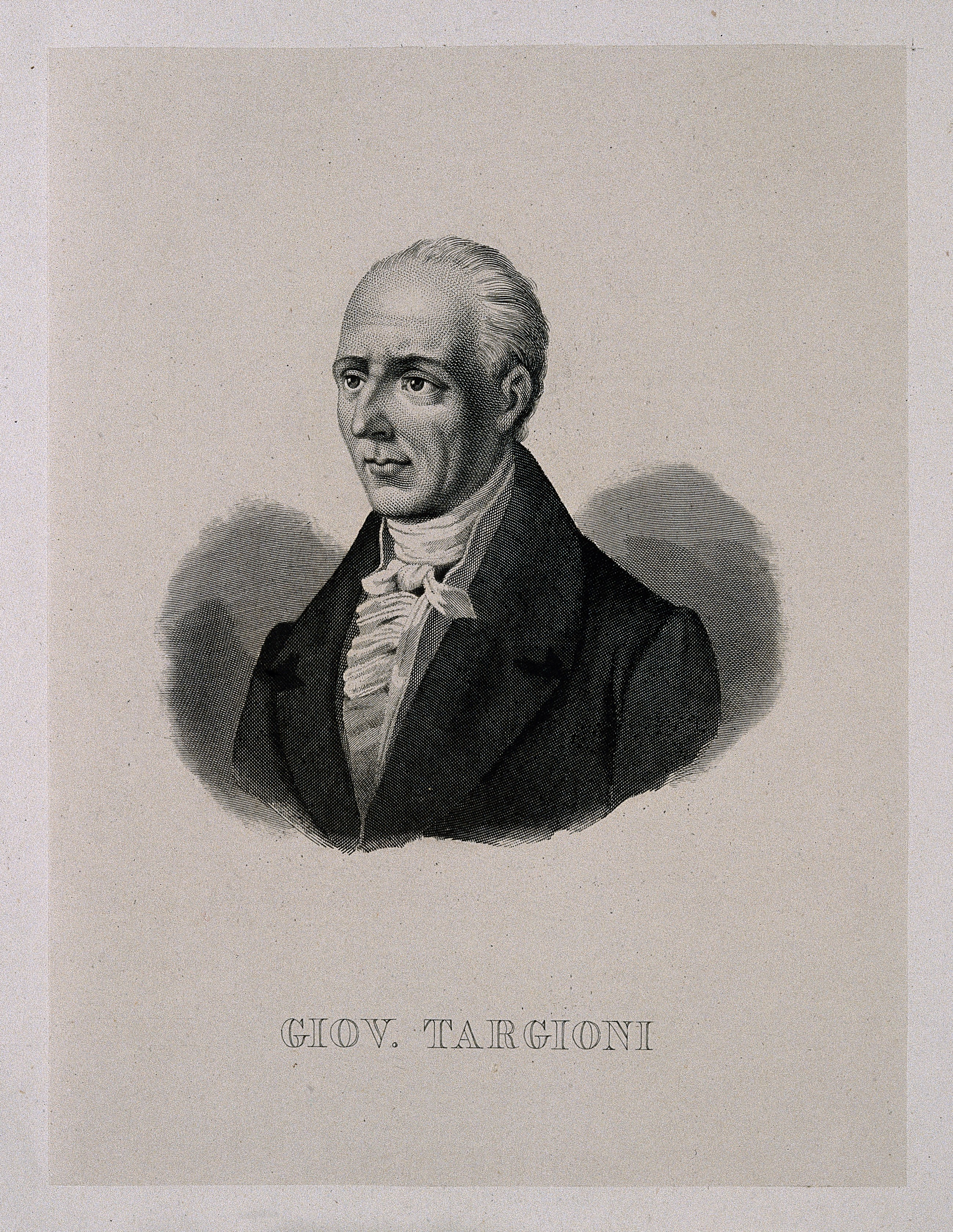
Portrait. Credit: Wellcome Collection

Giovanni Targioni Tozzetti (11 September 1712 in Florence – 7 January 1783 in Florence) was an Italian botanist and naturalist.

== Biography ==
He studied at the University of Pisa, and at the age of 22 was nominated to become a professor. He would move to Florence, where he joined the botanical society directed by Pier Antonio Micheli. He published observations on the cures of maladies with botanicals, about the epidemic in 1752, and a grain disease in 1733 and 1766.

He served the Tuscan Grand Dukes as a doctor, and was appointed commissioner of sanitation in the program to vaccinate for smallpox. He was supervisor of the Florence Botanical Garden, succeeded by Saverio Manetti. He had varied interests including writing about ways to prevent the Arno from flooding and about local archeologic artifacts.

== Works ==
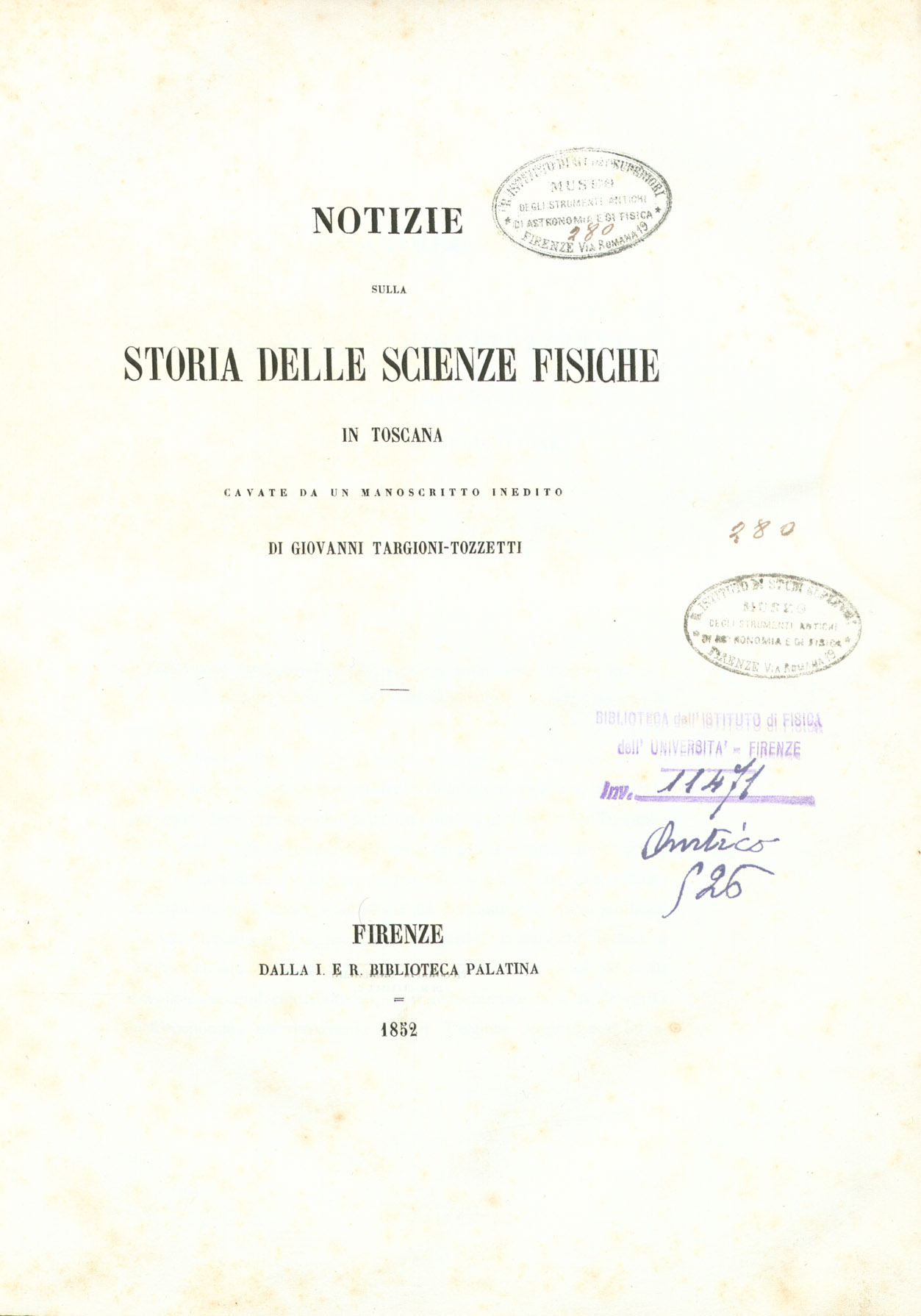
Notizie sulla storia delle scienze fisiche in Toscana, 1852

Among his publications were:

- Lettera sopra una numerosissima specie di farfalle vedutasi in Firenze sulla metà di luglio 1741 (in Italian). Firenze: Giovanni Battista Bruscagli & C. 1741.
- Relazione d'alcuni viaggi fatti in diverse parti della Toscana (with illustrations and maps by Ferdinando Morozzi)
- Lista di notizie di storia naturale della Toscana
- Prodromo della corografia e della topografia fisica della Toscana(1736)
- Relazioni di alcuni innesti de vaiuolo (smallpox) fatti in Firenze
- Ragionamenti sull'agricoltura toscana (in Italian). Lucca: Iacopo Giusti. 1759.
- Ragionamenti sopra le cause de i rimedi della insalubrita d'aria dell Valdinievole (1761)
- Sitologia, o raccolta di osservazioni, esperienze e ragionamenti sopra la natura e qualita de grani e delle farine
- Alimurgi, ossia modo di render meno gravi le carestie (famine)
- Istruzioni circa la maniera di accrescere il pane con l'uso di alcune sostanze vegetabili (1767)
- Disamine di alcuni progetti fatti nel sec XVI per salvar Firenze dalle inondazioni dell'Arno
- Relazione delle febbri che si sono provate epidemiche in diversa parti della Toscana l'anno 1767
- Raccolta di opuscoli medico-pratici
- Raccolta di teorie, osservazioni, e regole per dissipare le asfissie
- Notizie degli aggrandimenti delle scienze fisiche accaduti in Toscana nel corso di anni 60 nel seculo XVII
- Notizie sulla storia delle scienze fisiche in Toscana (in Italian). Firenze: Biblioteca Palatina. 1852.

Apparently met Caso Umbria in the 1730s. After the age of catastrophe, to give strong evidence on geomorphological activities occurring on earth, he postulated that the irregular courses (symmetry and asymmetry of the valleys) of the rivers depended on the nature of rocks through which they flow. The regions of massive and resistant rocks maintain deep and narrow courses (valleys) whereas broad and meandering courses are developed in the regions of soft and less resistant rocks. Thus, this concept gives a glimpse of differential erosion.
