= Ombrone Pistoiese =

River in Italy

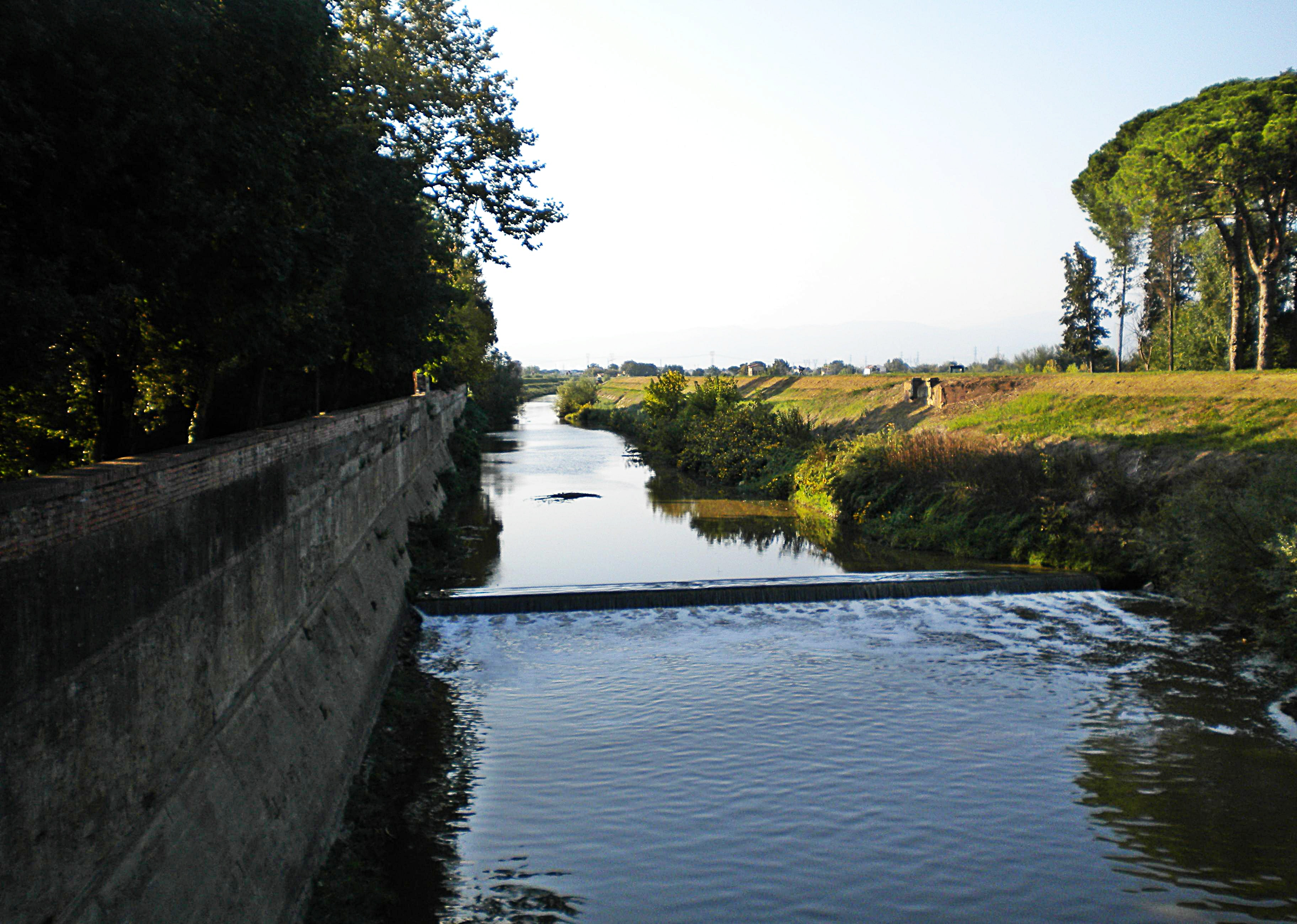
- The Ombrone Pistoiese near Poggio a Caiano

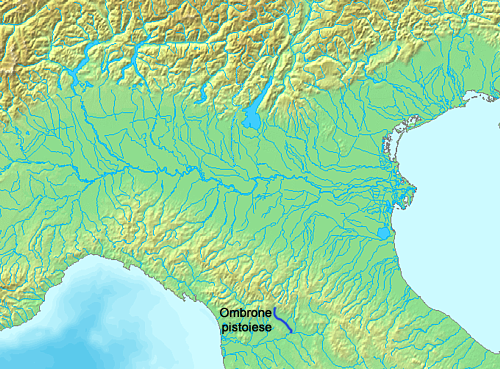
- Location of the Ombrone Pistoiese within Northern Italy

Location
- Country: Italy
- Region: Tuscany

Physical characteristics
- Source
  - coordinates: 44°02′02.12″N 10°54′47.39″E
- Length: 47 kilometres (29 mi)

Basin features
- River system: Arno
- Tributaries
  - left: Vincio di Brandeglio, Vincio di Montagnana, Torrente Stella, Furba
  - right: The Calice (torrente), including Torrente Brana, Bure (torrente), Torrente Agna

The Ombrone Pistoiese is an Italian river and a tributary of the Arno.

A number of streams feed Ombrone Pistoiese, including the Brana, the Bure, and the Agna.
