= Arno =

Italian river in Tuscany

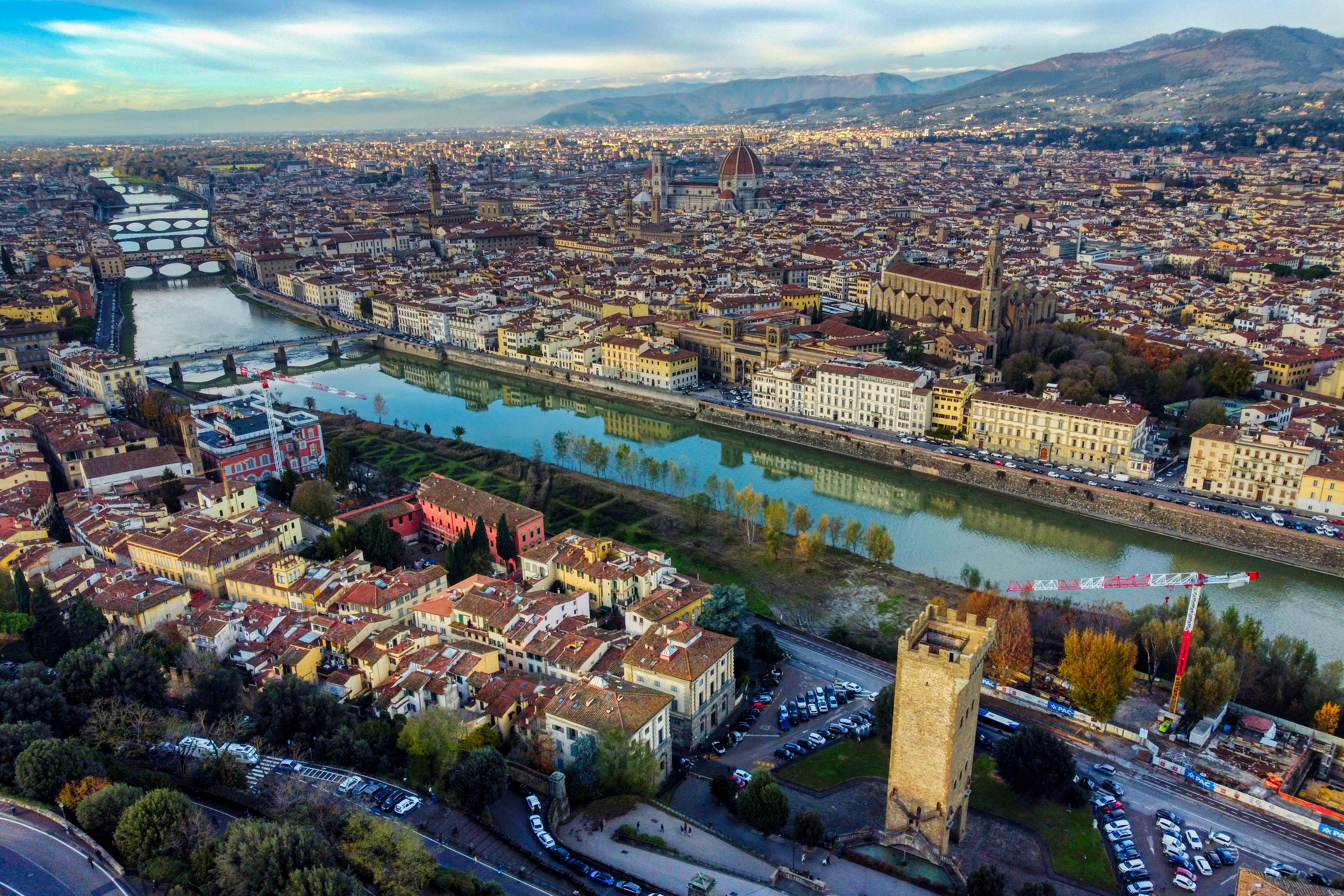
- View of the Arno from the Piazzale Michelangelo

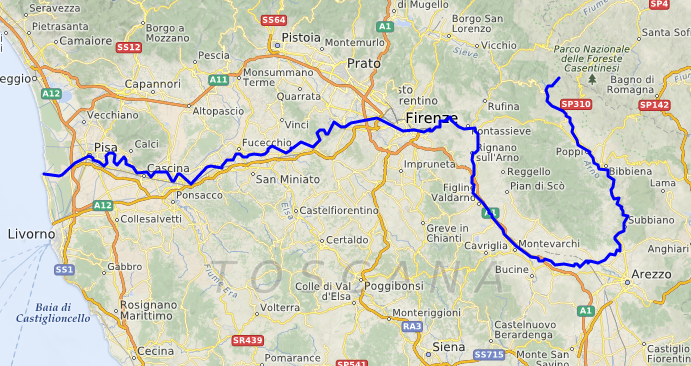

Location
- Country: Italy
- Region: Tuscany

Physical characteristics
- Source: Monte Falterona
  - elevation: 1,385 m (4,544 ft)
- Mouth: Tyrrhenian Sea
  - location: Marina di Pisa
  - coordinates: 43.6802°N 10.2774°E
- Length: 241 km (150 mi)
- Basin size: 8,228 km^{2} (3,177 mi^{2})
- Discharge
  - average: 110 m^{3}/s (3,900 cu ft/s) (at the mouth)

The Arno is a river in the Tuscany region of Italy. It is the most important river of central Italy after the Tiber.

== Source and route ==
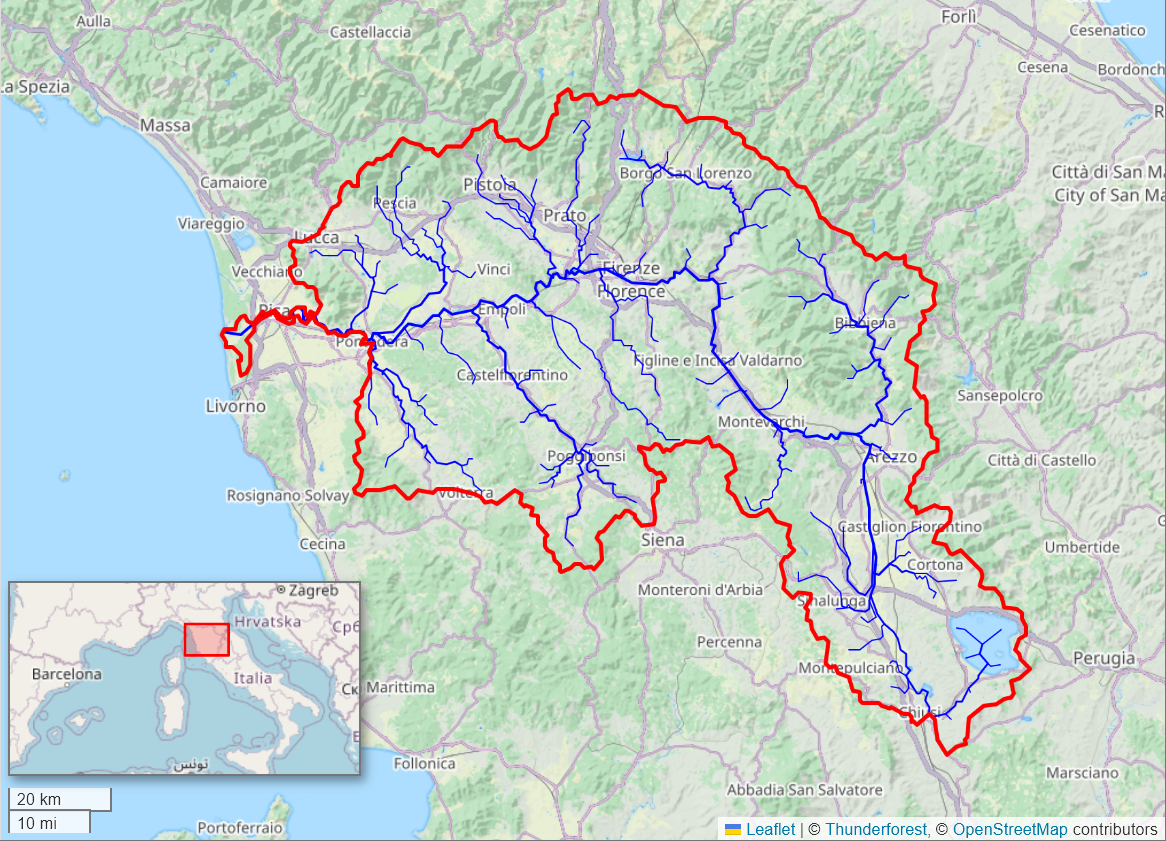
Map of the Arno River watershed (Interactive map)

The river originates on Monte Falterona in the Casentino area of the Apennines, and initially takes a southward curve. The river turns to the west near Arezzo passing through Florence, Empoli and Pisa, flowing into the Tyrrhenian Sea at Marina di Pisa.

With a length of 241 kilometres (150 mi), it is the largest river in the region. It has many tributaries: Sieve at 60 kilometres (37 mi) long, Bisenzio at 49 kilometres (30 mi), Ombrone Pistoiese at 47 kilometres (29 mi), and the Era, Elsa, Pesa, and Pescia. The drainage basin amounts to more than 8,200 square kilometres (3,200 sq mi) and drains the waters of the following subbasins:

- The Casentino, in the province of Arezzo, formed by the upper course of the river until its confluence with the Maestro della Chiana channel.
- The Val di Chiana, a plain drained in the 18th century, which until then had been a marshy area tributary of the Tiber.
- The upper Valdarno, a long valley bordered on the east by the Pratomagno massif and on the west by the hills around Siena.
- The Sieve's basin, which flows into the Arno immediately before Florence.
- The middle Valdarno, with the plain including Florence, Sesto Fiorentino, Prato, and Pistoia.
- The lower Valdarno, with the valley of important tributaries such as the Pesa, Elsa, and Era and in which, after Pontedera, the Arno flows into the sea. The river has a very variable discharge, ranging from about 6 cubic metres per second (210 cu ft/s) to more than 2,000 cubic metres per second (71,000 cu ft/s). The mouth of the river was once near Pisa but is now several kilometres westwards.

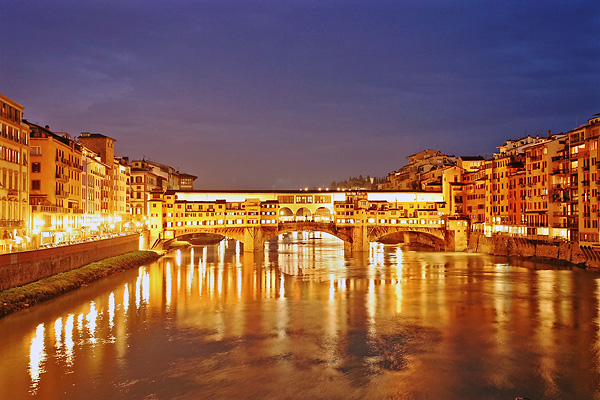
Ponte Vecchio over the Arno in Florence

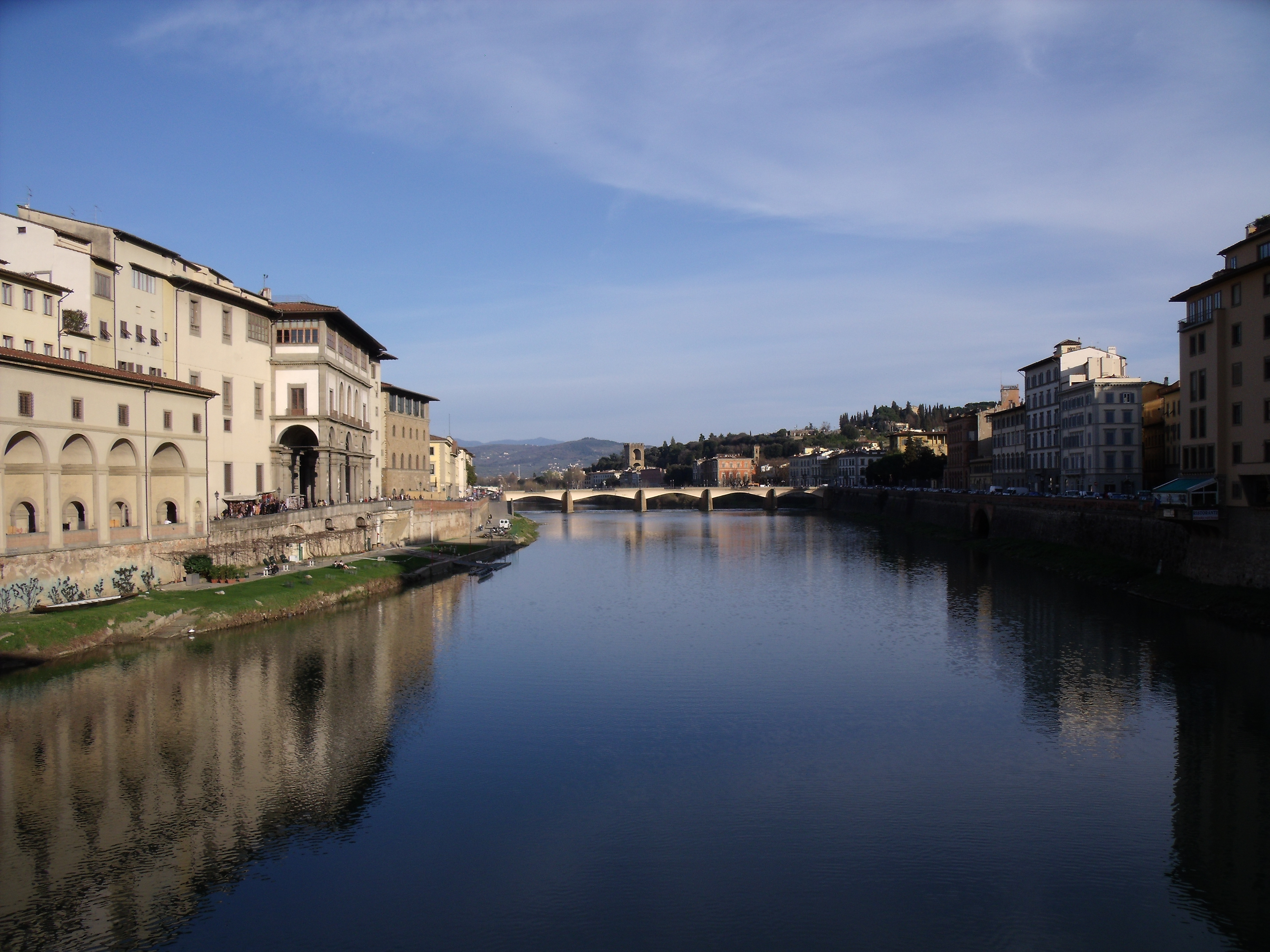
View of the Arno from the Ponte Vecchio

It crosses Florence, where it passes below the Ponte Vecchio and the Santa Trinita bridge (built by Bartolomeo Ammannati but inspired by Michelangelo).

Before Pisa, the Arno is crossed by the Imperial Canal at La Botte. This water channel passes under the Arno through a tunnel, and serves to drain the former area of the Lago di Bientina, which was once the largest lake in Tuscany before its reclamation.

The flow rate of the Arno is irregular. It is sometimes described as having a torrentlike behaviour, because it can easily go from almost dry to near flood in a few days. At the point where the Arno leaves the Apennines, flow measurements can vary between 0.56 and 4,100 cubic metres per second (20 and 144,790 cu ft/s). New dams built upstream of Florence have greatly alleviated the problem in recent years.

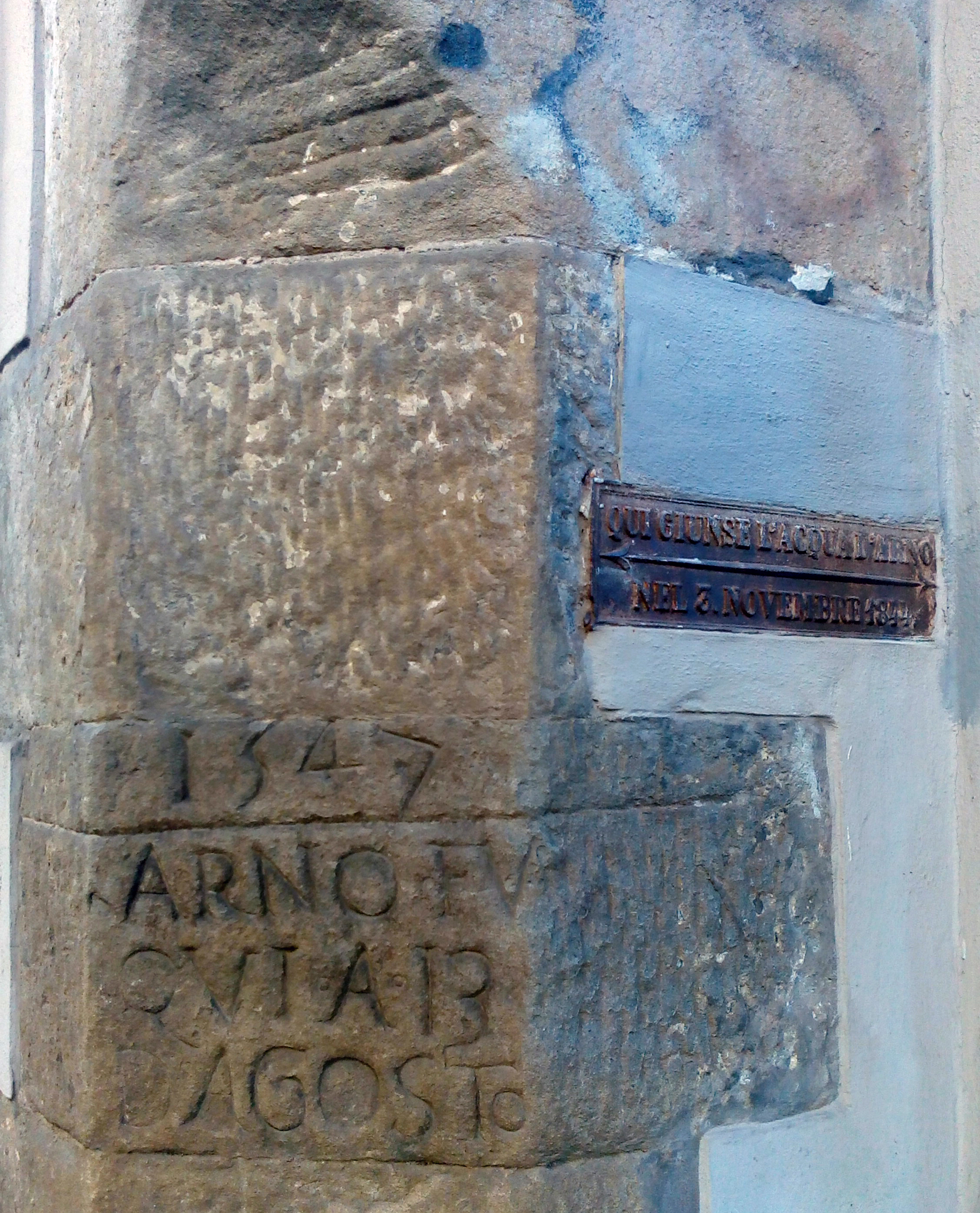
High water marks of Arno river floods on August 13, 1547 (left) and November 3, 1844 (metal plate on the right). Photographed in Via delle Casine.

In his 1962 work On the Ancient and Modern State of the Arno River, Ferdinando Morozzi reveals that between 1177 and 1761 the river overflowed 54 times, over half of those being major-to-severe floods. Arguably the most severe flood of recent times, the 1966 Flood of the Arno, resulted in flow measurements of 4,200 cubic metres per second after rainfall of 338.7 mm in Badia Agnano and more than 200mm in Florence, in only 24 hours.

On November 4th, the Florence embankment collapsed, reportedly killing between 35 to over 100 people, damaging or destroying millions of works of art and rare books. The disaster was met with an international relief effort, including funding in the sum of over £100,000 raised by the UK Italian Art and Archives Rescue Fund (IAARF) by 1967 and around $2.5 million raised by the US Committee to Rescue Italian Art (CRIA). New conservation techniques were inspired by the disaster, but even decades later hundreds of works still await restoration.

== Etymology ==
From Latin Arnus (Pliny, Natural History 3.50). The philologist Hans Krahe related this toponym on a paleo-European basis *Ar-n-, derived from the Proto-Indo-European root *er-, "flow, move". The hydronym is closely akin to another nearby hydronym, Reno.

== Ecology ==
The Arno river has been strongly affected by non-native species: over 90% of fish species and 70% of macroinvertebrate species in the area around Florence are alien species. These include the European catfish, channel catfish, Crucian carp, common bleak, topmouth gudgeon, New Zealand mud snail, and killer shrimp. The mud crab has been found in the river near Pisa.

== Uses and human impacts ==
Water from the Arno drainage basin is used for drinking water, irrigation, and firefighting. Citizens in the central part of the drainage basin also identified flood control, support for biodiversity, fisheries, and cultural value as other services that the river provides. There is the risk that flooding will jeopardize these ecosystem services, as 9% of wastewater treatment plants, 10% of landfills or other waste sites, and 4.5% of contaminated sites are at high risk of flooding, which would produce hotspots of pollution.

== Mythology and iconography ==
The river god Arno is the personification of the river. He is commonly portrayed as a reclining, bearded figure holding an urn from which the river waters flow. This depiction was a renaissance innovation, reappropriating an ancient statue.

== Gallery ==
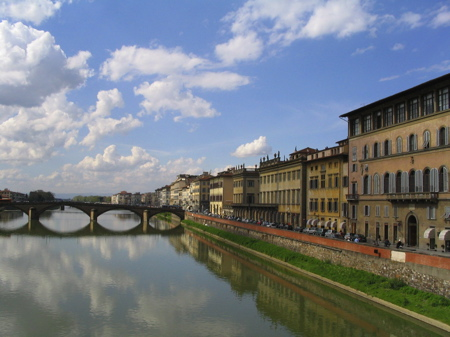
The Arno in Florence

The Arno in Pisa, viewed from the rail bridge

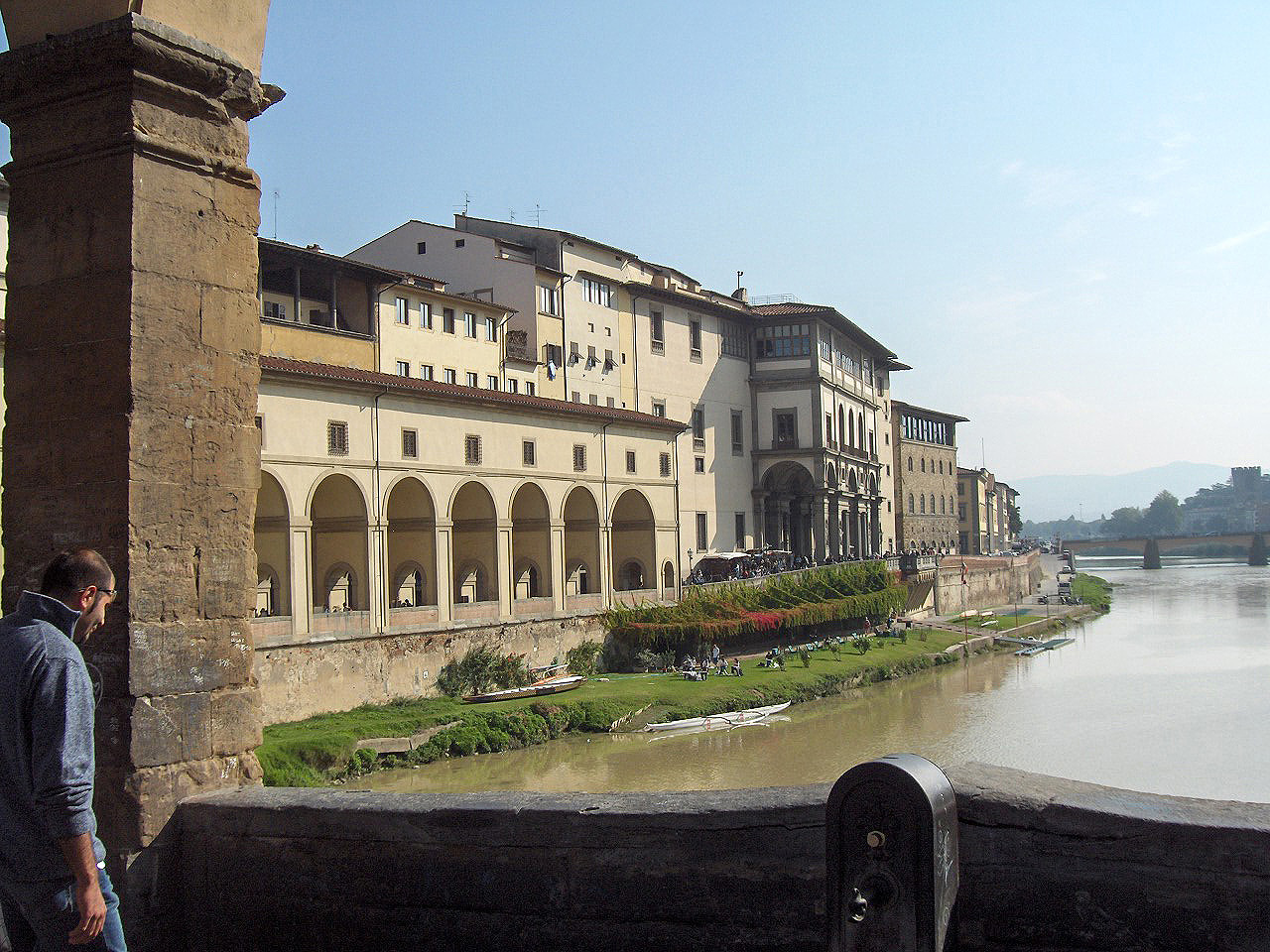
Banks of the Arno, seen from the Ponte Vecchio (Old Bridge), Florence

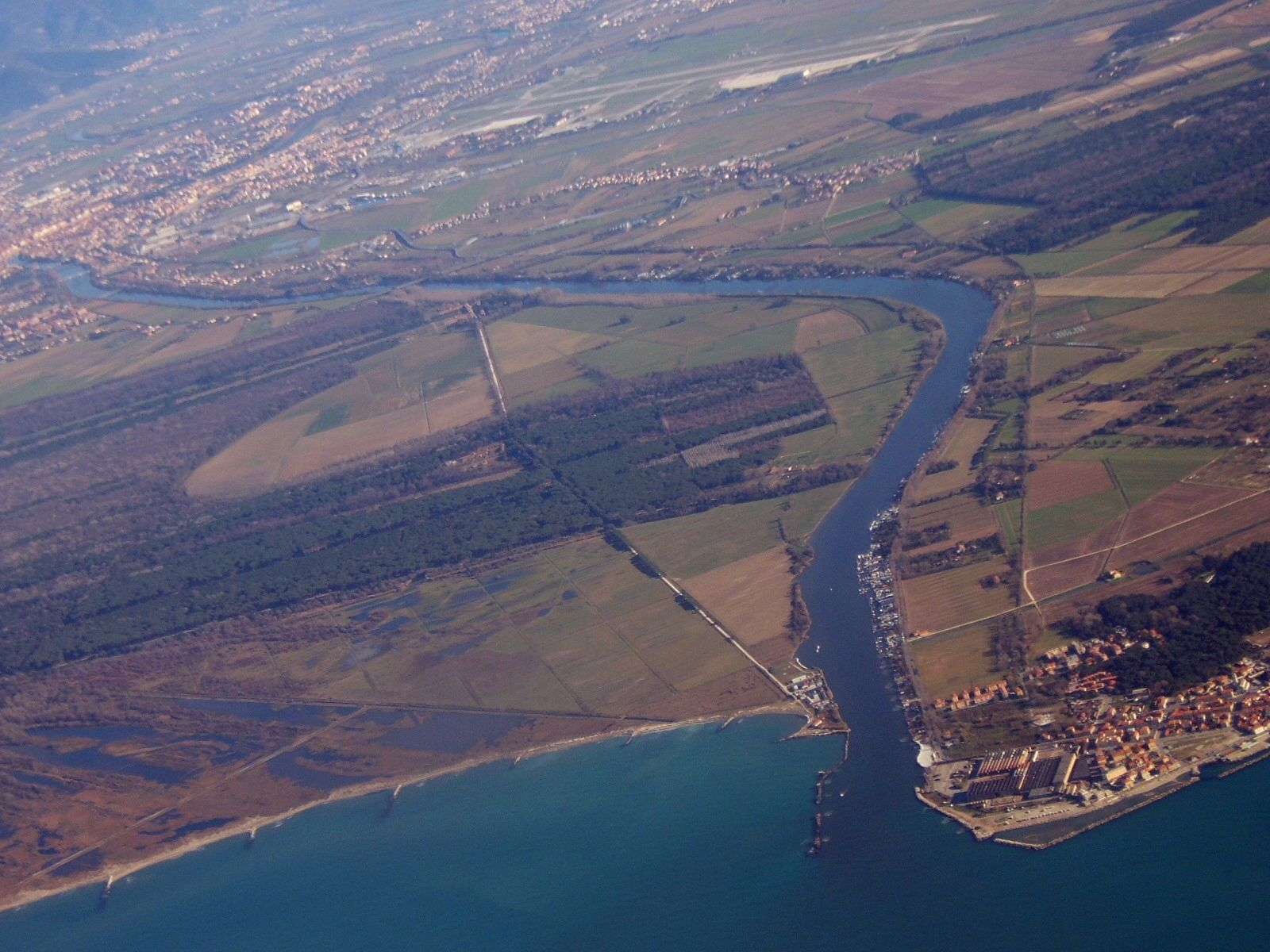
Mouth of the Arno in Marina di Pisa

The Arno in Florence, 180 degree view: the Uffizi Gallery is straight across and the Ponte Vecchio is to the left

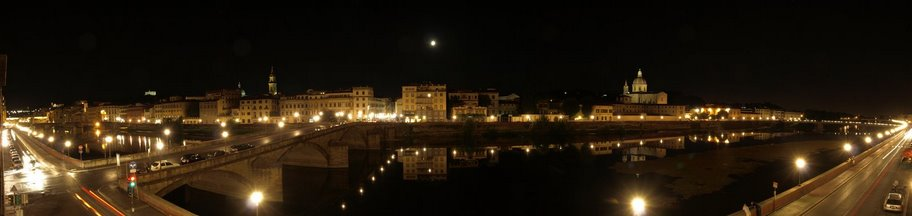
The Arno in Florence at night

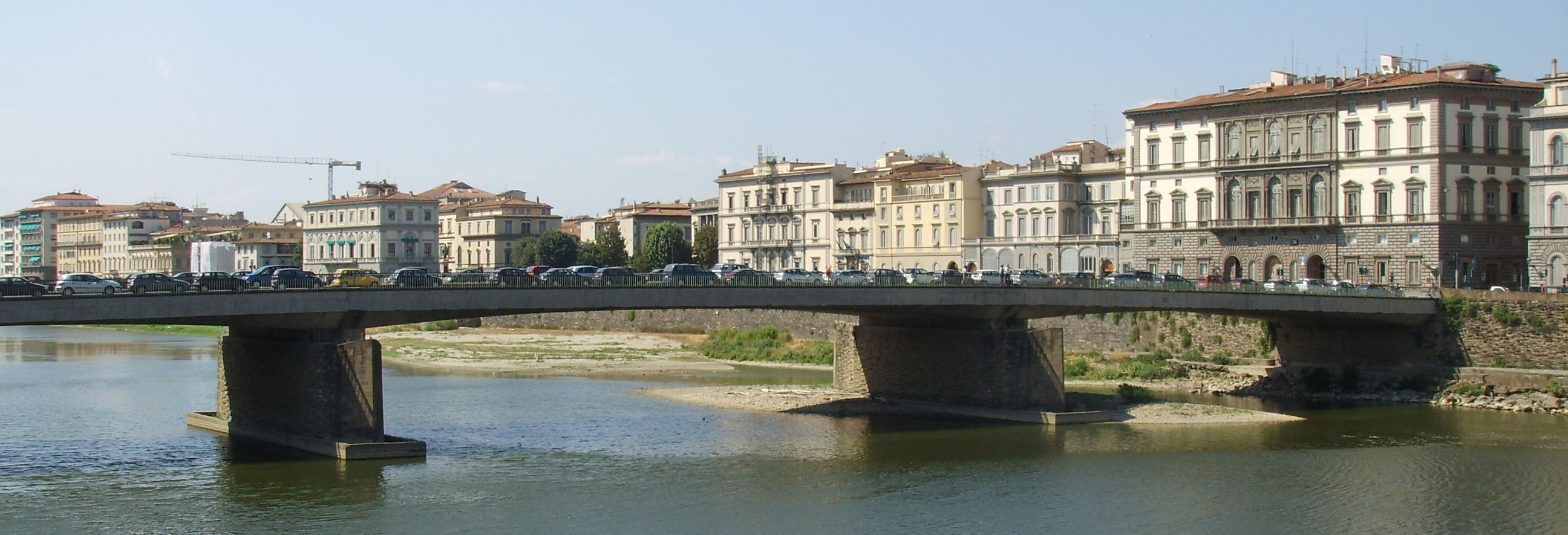
The Ponte Amerigo Vespucci (Amerigo Vespucci Bridge)
