= Manettia skutchii =

Conservation status
- Endangered (IUCN 3.1)

Scientific classification
- Kingdom: Plantae
- Clade: Tracheophytes
- Clade: Angiosperms
- Clade: Eudicots
- Clade: Asterids
- Order: Gentianales
- Family: Rubiaceae
- Genus: Manettia
- Species: M. skutchii

Binomial name
- Manettia skutchii Standl.

Species of plant

Manettia skutchii is a species of plant in the family Rubiaceae. It is endemic to Ecuador.
