= Ferdinando Morozzi =

Italian cartographer and architect

Ferdinando Morozzi (11 November 1723 – 3 December 1785) was an Italian cartographer and architect.

== Life ==
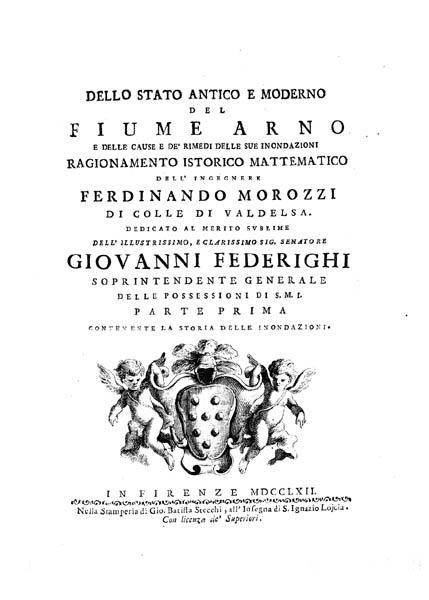
Dello stato antico e moderno del fiume Arno (1762)

Ferdinando Morozzi was born in Siena in 1723 and was lecturer of mathematics and "Second Engineer” at the Grand Duchy of Tuscany. In 1746 he moved with his family to Florence, the judicial and economic troubles of his father being the cause of this relocation. In Florence, Ferdinando learned mathematics and obtained the qualification of engineer. He studied the basin of Arno river and its devastating floods. In 1768 he drew an accurate map of the Grand Duchy of Tuscany.

In 1770 he published a treatise about country houses. He wrote which the houses had to be constructed thinking about the environmental (mountain, hill and plain) and cultural differences; the houses should have built at the center of the farm, with walls to store warmth and a good number of spacious, bright rooms, to be dedicated to domestic life and to work; the external stairs had to be easy and possibly covered "for the part of Tramontane wind" to avoid the frost in winter and defend against any fall.

He collaborated with Giovanni Targioni Tozzetti at the work Viaggi fatti in diverse parti della Toscana per osservare le produzioni naturali e gli antichi monumenti di essa ("Travels made in different parts of Tuscany to observe the natural productions and the ancient monuments of it"), by drawing many illustrations and maps. He also restored the Varii theatre in Colle Val d'Elsa. After his death in 1785 in Florence, his rich collection of drawings and maps went almost totally lost.

== Works ==
- Memorie di istoria ecclesiastica civile e letteraria di Colle Val d'Elsa (1755)
- Sullo stato antico e moderno del fiume Arno (1766)
- Delle case de' contadini. Trattato architettonico (1770)
- Elogio di Niccolò Beltramini di Colle Val d'Elsa (1773)
- Dello stato antico e moderno del fiume Arno e delle cause e de' rimedi delle sue inondazioni. Vol. 1. In Firenze: nella stamperia di Gio. Batista Stecchi, all'insegna di S. Ignazio Lojola. 1762.
- Dello stato antico e moderno del fiume Arno e delle cause e de' rimedi delle sue inondazioni. Vol. 2. In Firenze: nella stamperia di Gio. Batista Stecchi, all'insegna di S. Ignazio di Lojola. 1766.

== Bibliography ==
- Farinella, Calogero (2012) [1960]. "MOROZZI, Orazio Ferdinando". Dizionario Biografico degli Italiani, Volume 77: Morlini–Natolini (in Italian). Rome: Istituto dell'Enciclopedia Italiana. ISBN 978-8-81200032-6.
