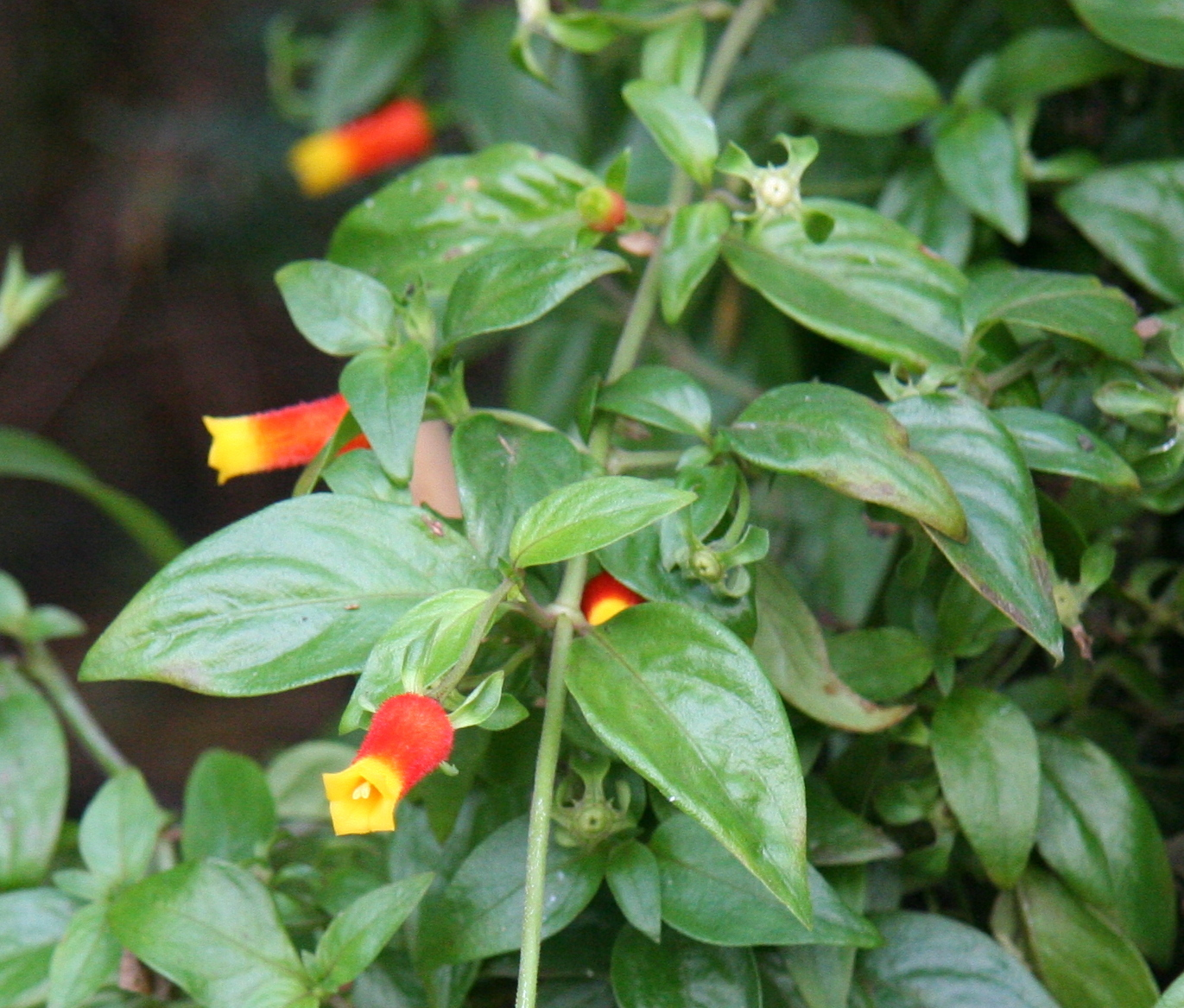
- Manettia luteorubra

Scientific classification
- Kingdom: Plantae
- Clade: Tracheophytes
- Clade: Angiosperms
- Clade: Eudicots
- Clade: Asterids
- Order: Gentianales
- Family: Rubiaceae
- Subfamily: Rubioideae
- Tribe: Spermacoceae
- Genus: Manettia; Mutis ex L.

Species
- See text

= Manettia =

Genus of flowering plants

Manettia is a genus of flowering plants in the family Rubiaceae. There are between 80 and 123 species. They are distributed in the West Indies, Mexico, and Central and South America. Most are vines. The genus was named after Saverio Manetti.

Species include:

- Manettia angamarcensis
- Manettia arboricola
- Manettia canescens
- Manettia cordifolia
- Manettia herthae
- Manettia holwayi
- Manettia lilacina
- Manettia longicalycina
- Manettia luteorubra
- Manettia microphylla
- Manettia nebulosa
- Manettia nubigena
- Manettia pichinchensis
- Manettia racemosa Ruiz & Pav.
- Manettia skutchii
- Manettia stenocalyx
- Manettia teresitae
- Manettia umbellata Ruiz & Pav.
