= Saverio Manetti =

Italian botanist (1723–1785)

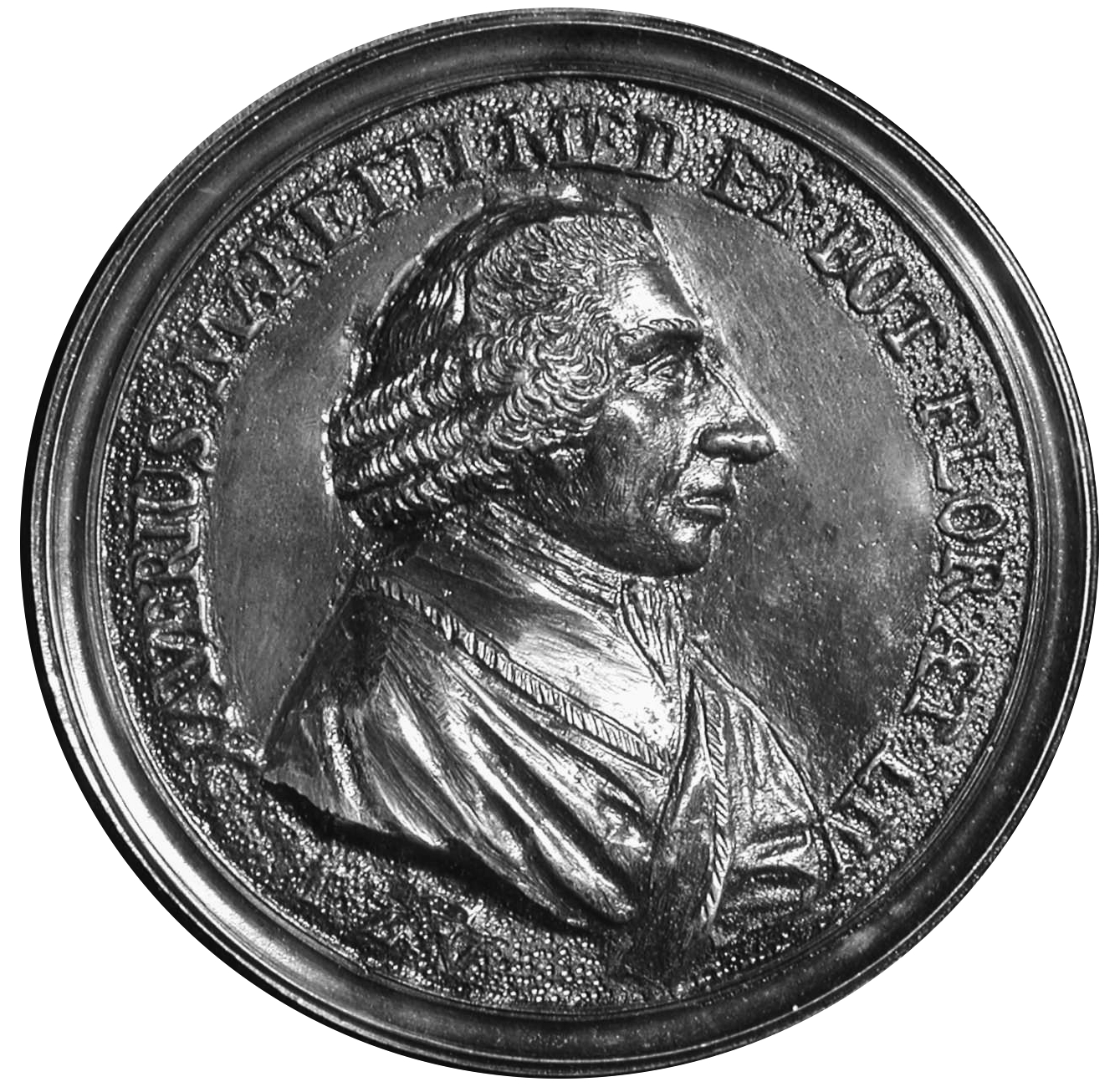
Profile of Manetti in a 1777 medal by Giovanni Zanobio Weber

Francesco Saverio Manetti also spelt Xaviero or Xaverio Manetti (Latinized as Franciscus Xaverius Manetti civis Florentinus) (12 November 1723 – 12 November 1785) was an Italian physician, botanist and ornithologist. Among his works is the treatise on birds, Ornithologia methodice digesta or Storia naturale degli uccelli (1776). The plant genus Manettia was named in his honour by Carl Linnaeus.

Manetti was born in Brozzi to Giovanni Bernardo and Maria Teresa Nesiscolt of Prague. His early studies were in Florence and later at Pisa where he studied botany under Pier Antonio Micheli. He graduated in medicine in 1745 and worked in Florence. In 1758 he joined the National Medical College where he studied anatomy under Antonio Cocchi (1695–1758), conducting the autopsy of Cocchi. Manetti was Professor of Botany of the "Società Botanica Fiorentina", a member of the German Academy of Sciences Leopoldina, a Fellow of the Royal Society, learned societies in Göttingen and Montpellier, an Accademico dell'Istituto di Bologna and he maintained scientific contacts with the Swedish botanist Carl Linnaeus and with the main scientific circles of the second half of the 18th century.

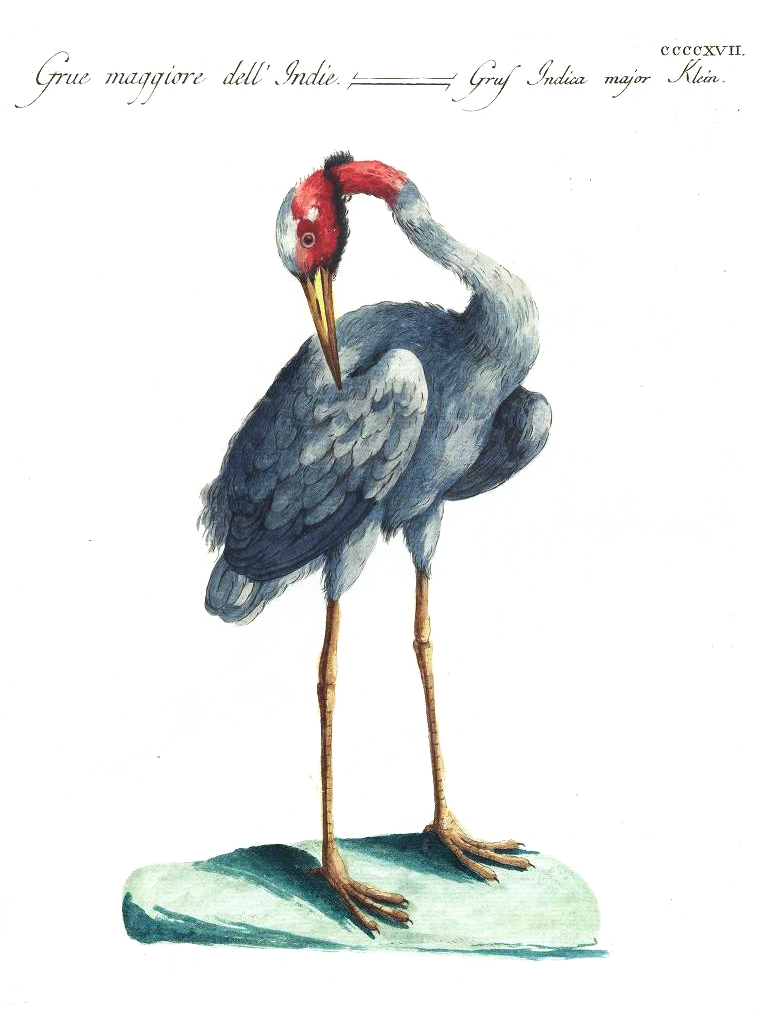
Sarus crane from Ornithologia methodice digesta volume 4 (1777)

He was supervisor of the Orto Botanico di Firenze in Florence from 1749 to 1782 succeeding to Giovanni Targioni Tozzetti and Secretary of the Accademia dei Georgofili. With remarkable organizational effort, he secured the publication of Storia naturale degli uccelli, Natural History of the birds, a monumental work in five volumes illustrated with 600 hand-coloured engravings based on watercolor paintings. The book was commissioned by Maria Luisa, Grand duchess of Tuscany and the first volume was dedicated to Grand Duke Pietro Leopoldo. The third volume was dedicated to Ferdinando di Brobone and the fourth to Giorgio Nassau Clavering. The engravings were made by Tuscan abbot and engraver Lorenzo Lorenzi and Violante Vanni who had studied under British engraver Robert Strange. Engraving was an unusual profession for women in Florence during the period.

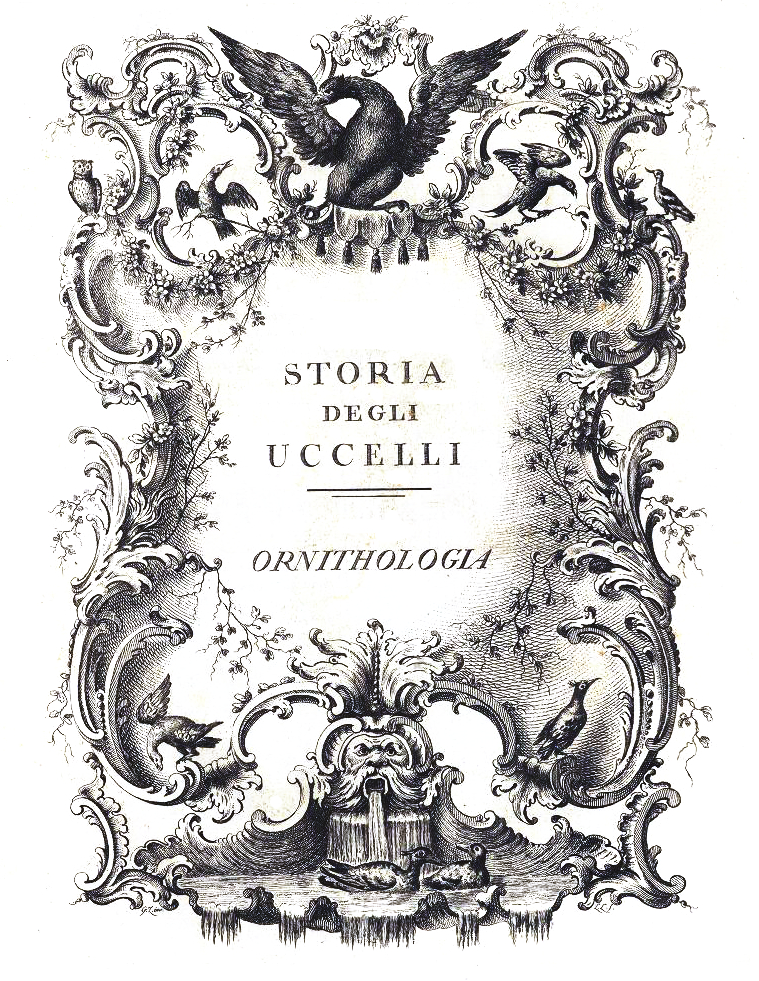
Title page of volume 4 Storia degli Ucelli

Manetti also took interest in agriculture and wrote a book on the varieties of wheat. He also wrote on wine and viniculture, Oenologia toscana (1773) under the pen-name of Giovanni Cosimo Villifranchi.

Manetti was honoured by the plant genus Manettia erected by Carolus Linnaeus.

== Works ==
- 1751. Viridarium Florentinum: sive, Conspectus plantarum quae floruerunt, & semina deterunt hoc anno 1750 in Horto Caesareo Florentino109 pp.
- 1751 Conspectus plantarum. Ed. Ex Typographia Bernardi Paperini, 139 pp.
- 1751 Illustrissimo ac generoso Societatis Botanicae Florentinae praesidi Antonio Francisco Acciaioli Toriglioni ... hoc observantiae venerationisque suae monumentum d.d.d. Xaverius Manetti: (Spicilegium plantas continens CCCXXV. Viridario Florentino addendas pro aestivis demonstrationibus hujus anni 1751. 32 pp.
- 1756 With Carl Linnaeus Regnum vegetabile iuxta systema naturae in classes, ordines et genera constitutum. 116 pp.
- 1754 With François Boissier de Sauvages Due Dissertazioni fisico-mediche Ed. Gaetano Albizzini. 286 pp.
- 1762 Lettera de sig. dott. Saverio Manetti: che puo servire di Supplemento al suo Trattato sull' inoculazione del vajuolo : diretta al dottore Giuseppe Angelo Casagrande Cremonese Ed. Appresso Andrea Bonducc. 52 pp.
- 1765 With Andrea Ginori Delle specie diverse di frumento e di pane siccome della panizzazione memoria. Ed. Moücke. 237 pp.
- 1765–1776 Storia naturale degli uccelli trattata con metodo e adornata di figure intagliate in rame e miniate al naturale. Ornithologia methodice digesta atque iconibus aeneis ad vivum illuminatis ornate. [Natural History of the Birds Treated Systematically and Adorned with Copperplate Engraving Illustrations, in Miniature and Life-Size] with the artists Lorenzo Lorenzi and Violante Vanni and based on the collections of Marchese Giovanni Gerini.
- 1773 Oenologia toscana o sia Memoria sopra i vini ed in specie toscani (written under the pen-name of Cosimo Villifranchi )
