= Marina di Pisa =

- Frazione
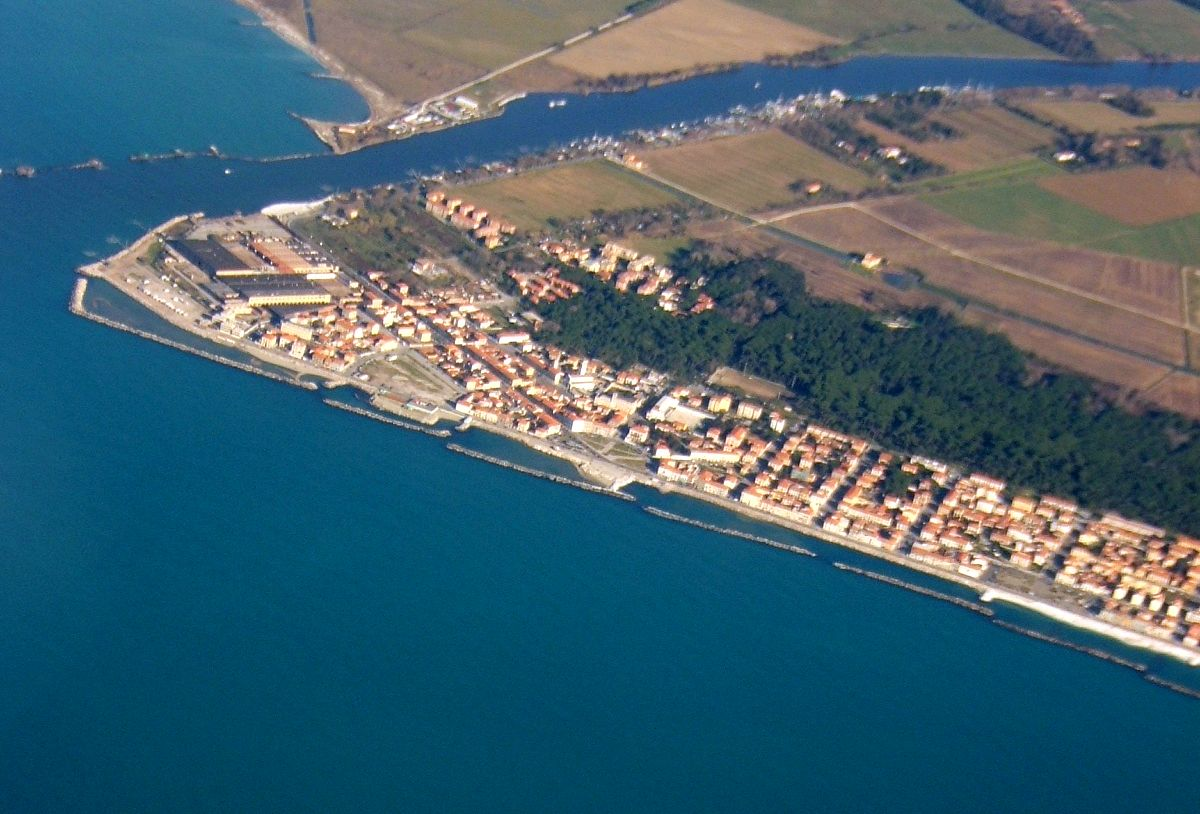
- Aerial view of Marina di Pisa

- Location of Marina di Pisa in Italy
- Coordinates: 43°40′20″N 10°16′37″E
- Country: Italy
- Region: Tuscany
- Province: Pisa (PI)
- Comune: Pisa
- Elevation: 2 m (6.6 ft)

Population
  - Total: 3,570
- Time zone: UTC+1 (CET)
  - Summer (DST): UTC+2 (CEST)
- Postal code: 56128
- Dialing code: (+39) 050

Marina di Pisa is a seaside resort of Tuscany, in central Italy. It is a frazione of the provincial capital of Pisa, which lies about 10 km to the east.

Marina di Pisa was mostly built during the economic boom of the late 1800s, as a seaside resort. It was further developed in the 1930s. Many marine support industries developed at the mouth of the Arno river and in the area along its banks.

== Geography ==
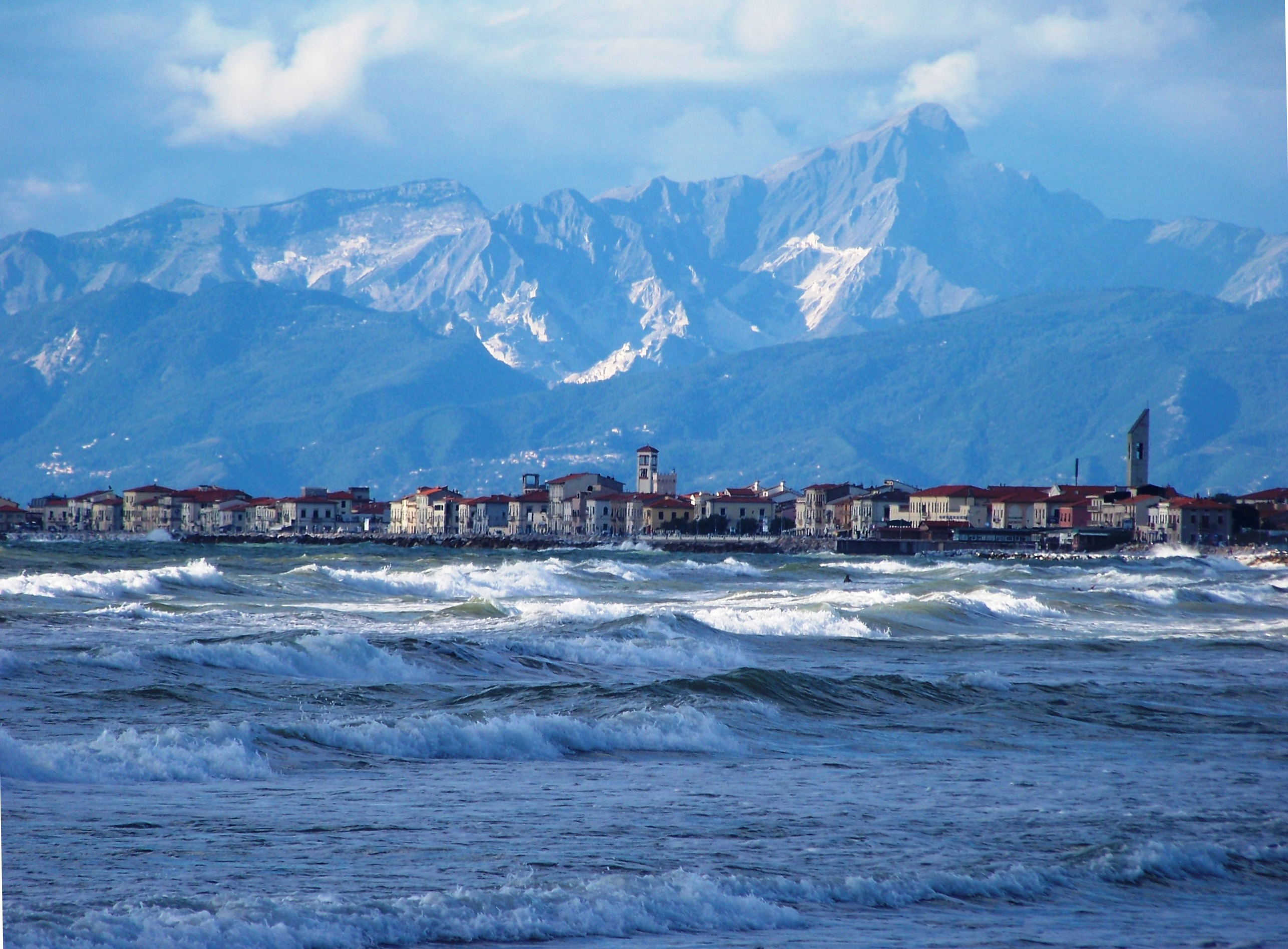
Marina di Pisa seen from Tirrenia

Marina di Pisa lies on the left bank of the Arno River, where it flows into the Tyrrhenian Sea. It is located directly north of the seaside resort of Tirrenia and about 10 kilometers West from Pisa.

Behind the town are forested sections of the Parco Regionale San Rossore, Migliarino, e Massaciucoli. From Marina di Pisa, it is possible to see the islands of Corsica, Elba and Gorgona; and the mountains of the Apuan Alps, Apennines, and Monti Pisani above Pisa.

== Economy ==
The German aviation company Dornier Flugzeugwerke based most of their production in the town from 1922 to 1932, after The Treaty of Versailles of 1919 banned construction of engine-powered aircraft in Germany. Here they built the "Wal" twin-engine flying boat. The huge 'Savigliano' hangar (1925) which remained standing till 2007, was used for the production of the Wals, and work on the Do-X2 and 3 in the early 1930s. Then the world's largest airplanes, they were broken up for scrap here in 1937.

The village is mostly inhabited during summer, however there are many people that live here all year. A redevelopment project is under way at the mouth of the Arno, known as "Bocca d’Arno", in a disused industrial area where a new touristic port has been built and a new residential district will be inaugurated in the next years.
