= Flavin-containing amine oxidoreductase =

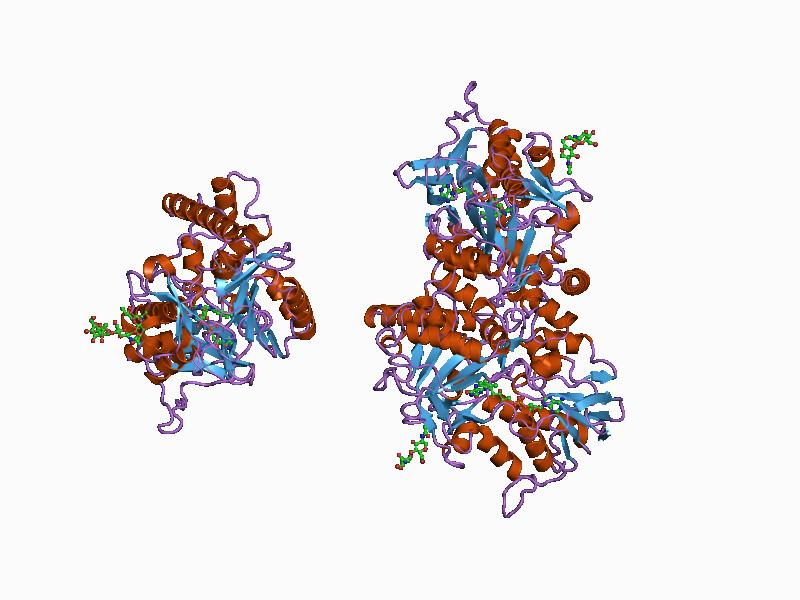
- Structure of polyamine oxidase.

Identifiers
- Symbol: Amino_oxidase
- Pfam: PF01593
- Pfam clan: CL0053
- InterPro: IPR001613
- PROSITE: PDOC00755
- SCOP2: 1b37 / SCOPe / SUPFAM
- OPM superfamily: 119
- OPM protein: 2z5x
- Membranome: 251
Available protein structures:
- PDB: IPR001613 PF01593 (ECOD; PDBsum)
- AlphaFold: IPR001613; PF01593

Flavin-containing amine oxidoreductases are a family of various amine oxidases, including maize polyamine oxidase (PAO), L-amino acid oxidases (LAO) and various flavin containing monoamine oxidases (MAO). The aligned region includes the flavin binding site of these enzymes. In vertebrates, MAO plays an important role in regulating the intracellular levels of amines via their oxidation; these include various neurotransmitters, neurotoxins and trace amines. In lower eukaryotes such as aspergillus and in bacteria the main role of amine oxidases is to provide a source of ammonium. PAOs in plants, bacteria and protozoa oxidise spermidine and spermine to an aminobutyral, diaminopropane and hydrogen peroxide and are involved in the catabolism of polyamines. Other members of this family include tryptophan 2-monooxygenase, putrescine oxidase, corticosteroid-binding proteins, and antibacterial glycoproteins.

== Human proteins containing this domain ==
AOF1; AOF2; IL4I1; MAOA; MAOB; PAOX; PPOX; SMOX;
