= Hyoscine (disambiguation) =

Hyoscine (a.k.a: Scopolamine, INN: Hyoscine hydrobromide) is a medication used to treat motion sickness and postoperative nausea and vomiting.

Hyoscine may also refer to:

- Hyoscine butylbromide (brand name Buscopan), used for abdominal pain, renal colic, or bladder spasms
- Hyoscine methobromide

== See also ==
- Hyoscyamine
