= Scopolamine =

Tropane alkaloid & anticholinergic drug

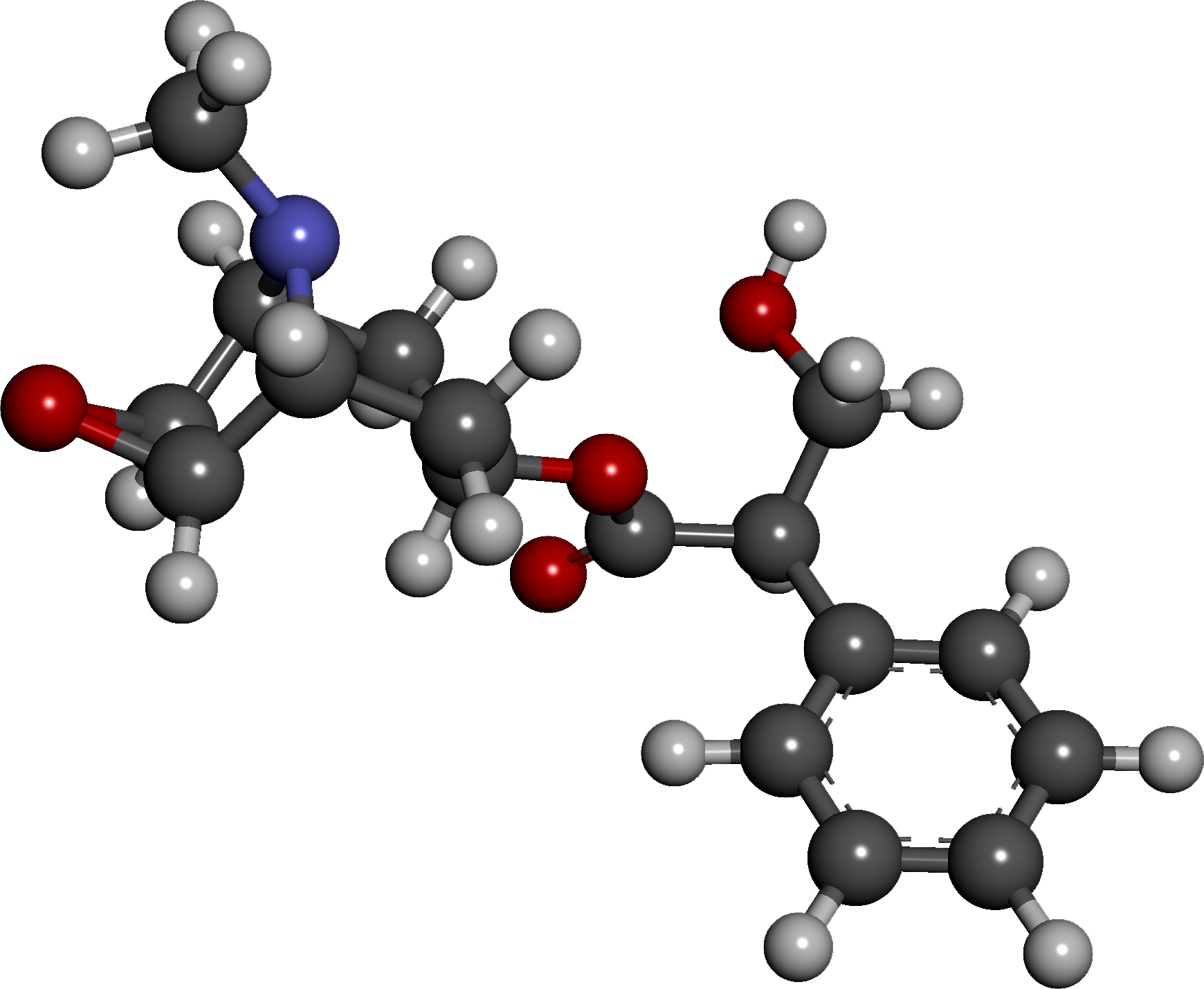

Clinical data
- Trade names: Transderm Scop, others
- Other names: Hyoscine, Devil's Breath
- AHFS/Drugs.com: Monograph
- MedlinePlus: a682509
- License data: US DailyMed: Scopolamine
- Pregnancy category: AU: B2
- Routes of administration: By mouth, transdermal, ophthalmic, subcutaneous, intravenous, sublingual, rectal, buccal, transmucosal, intramuscular
- Drug class: Antimuscarinic; Deliriant; Antiemetic; Amnestic
- ATC code: A04AD01 (WHO) N05CM05 (WHO), S01FA02 (WHO)

Legal status
- Legal status: AU: S4 (Prescription only) / S2; UK: POM (Prescription only) / P; US: ℞-only

Pharmacokinetic data
- Bioavailability: 20-40%
- Metabolism: Liver (CYP3A4)
- Elimination half-life: 5 hours
- Excretion: Kidney

Identifiers
- IUPAC name: (–)-(S)-3-Hydroxy-2-phenylpropionic acid (1R,2R,4S,5S,7α,9S)-9-methyl-3-oxa-9-azatricyclo[3.3.1.0^{2,4}]non-7-yl ester
- CAS Number: 51-34-3
- PubChem CID: 3000322
- IUPHAR/BPS: 330
- DrugBank: DB00747
- ChemSpider: 10194106
- UNII: DL48G20X8X; as salt: 451IFR0GXB
- KEGG: D00138; as salt: D02071
- ChEBI: CHEBI:16794
- ChEMBL: ChEMBL569713
- PDB ligand: OW0 (PDBe, RCSB PDB)
- CompTox Dashboard (EPA): DTXSID6023573
- ECHA InfoCard: 100.000.083

Chemical and physical data
- Formula: C_{17}H_{21}NO_{4}
- Molar mass: 303.358 g·mol^{−1}
- 3D model (JSmol): Interactive image
- SMILES: OC[C@H](c1ccccc1)C(=O)O[C@@H]2C[C@H]3N(C)[C@@H](C2)[C@@H]4O[C@H]34
- InChI: InChI=1S/C17H21NO4/c1-18-13-7-11(8-14(18)16-15(13)22-16)21-17(20)12(9-19)10-5-3-2-4-6-10/h2-6,11-16,19H,7-9H2,1H3/t11-,12-,13-,14+,15-,16+/m1/s1; Key:STECJAGHUSJQJN-FWXGHANASA-N

Scopolamine, also known as hyoscine, or Devil's Breath, is a muscarinic antagonist and tropane alkaloid used to treat motion sickness and postoperative nausea and vomiting. It is also sometimes used before surgery to decrease saliva. When used by injection, effects begin after about 20 minutes and last for up to 8 hours. It may also be used orally and as a transdermal patch since it has been long known to have transdermal bioavailability.

Scopolamine is in the muscarinic acetylcholine antagonist group of drugs and works by blocking the binding of acetylcholine within the central nervous system and peripheral tissues.

Scopolamine was first written about in 1881 and started to be used for anesthesia around 1900. Scopolamine is also the main active component produced by certain plants of the nightshade family, which historically have been used as psychoactive drugs, known as deliriants, due to their antimuscarinic-induced hallucinogenic effects in higher doses. In these contexts, its mind-altering effects have been utilized for recreational and occult purposes. The name scopolamine is derived from one type of nightshade known as Scopolia, while the name hyoscine is derived from another type known as Hyoscyamus niger, or black henbane. It is on the World Health Organization's List of Essential Medicines.

== Medical uses ==
Scopolamine has a number of formal uses in modern medicine where it is used in its isolated form and in low doses to treat:

- Postoperative nausea and vomiting
- Motion sickness, including sea sickness, leading to its use by scuba divers (where it is often applied as a transdermal patch behind the ear)
- Gastrointestinal spasms
- Kidney or liver spasms
- Aid in gastrointestinal radiology and endoscopy
- Adjunct Nerve agent countermeasure
- Irritable bowel syndrome
- Clozapine-induced drooling
- Bowel colic
- Eye inflammation

It is sometimes used as a premedication, especially to reduce respiratory tract secretions in surgery, most commonly by injection. Common side effects include sleepiness, blurred vision, dilated pupils, and dry mouth. It is not recommended in people with angle-closure glaucoma or bowel obstruction. Whether its use during pregnancy is safe remains unclear, and use during breastfeeding is still cautioned by health professionals and manufacturers of the drug.

Scopolamine can be taken by mouth, subcutaneously, in the eye, and intravenously, as well as via a transdermal patch.

=== Breastfeeding ===
Scopolamine enters breast milk by secretion. Although no human studies exist to document the safety of scopolamine while nursing, the manufacturer recommends that caution be taken if scopolamine is administered to a breastfeeding woman.

== Adverse effects ==
Adverse effect incidence:

Uncommon (0.1–1% incidence) adverse effects include:

- Dry mouth
- Anhidrosis (reduced ability to sweat to cool off)
- Tachycardia (usually occurs at higher doses and is succeeded by bradycardia)
- Bradycardia
- Urticaria (hives)
- Pruritus (itching)

Rare (<0.1% incidence) adverse effects include:

- Constipation
- Urinary retention
- Hallucinations
- Agitation
- Delirium
- Restlessness
- Seizures

Unknown frequency adverse effects include:

- Anaphylactic shock or reactions
- Dyspnea (shortness of breath)
- Rash
- Erythema
- Other hypersensitivity reactions
- Blurred vision
- Mydriasis (dilated pupils)
- Drowsiness
- Dizziness
- Somnolence

== Overdose ==
Physostigmine, a cholinergic drug that readily crosses the blood–brain barrier, has been used as an antidote to treat the central nervous system depression symptoms of a scopolamine overdose. Other than this supportive treatment, gastric lavage and induced emesis (vomiting) are usually recommended as treatments for oral overdoses. The symptoms of overdose include:

- Tachycardia
- Arrhythmia
- Blurred vision
- Photophobia
- Urinary retention
- Drowsiness or paradoxical reaction, which can present with hallucinations
- Cheyne–Stokes respiration
- Dry mouth
- Skin reddening
- Inhibition of gastrointestinal motility

== Pharmacology ==
=== Pharmacodynamics ===
The pharmacological effects of scopolamine are mediated through the drug's competitive antagonism of the peripheral and central muscarinic acetylcholine receptors. Scopolamine acts as a nonspecific muscarinic antagonist at all four (M_{1}, M_{2}, M_{3}, and M_{4}) receptor sites.

In doses higher than intended for medicinal use, the hallucinogenic alteration of consciousness, as well as the delirium in particular, are tied to the compound's activity at the M_{1} muscarinic receptor. M_{1} receptors are located primarily in the central nervous system and are involved in perception, attention, and cognitive functioning. Delirium is associated solely with the antagonism of postsynaptic M_{1} receptors; currently no other receptor subtypes have been implicated.

Peripheral muscarinic receptors are part of the autonomic nervous system. M_{2} receptors are located in the brain and heart, M_{3} receptors are in salivary glands and M_{4} receptors are in the brain and lungs. Due to the drug's inhibition of various signal transduction pathways, the decrease in acetylcholine signaling is what leads to many of the cognitive deficits, mental impairments, and delirium associated with psychoactive doses. Medicinal effects appear to mostly be tied to activation of the peripheral receptors and only from marginal decreases in acetylcholine signaling.

Although often broadly referred to as simply being 'anticholinergic', antimuscarinic would be more specific and accurate terminology to use for scopolamine, as, for example, it is not known to block nicotinic receptors.

=== Pharmacokinetics ===
Scopolamine undergoes first-pass metabolism and about 2.6% is excreted unchanged in urine. It has a bioavailability of 20–40%, reaches peak plasma concentration in about 45 minutes, and in healthy subjects has an average half-life of 5 hours (observed range 2–10 hours). Scopolamine is primarily metabolized by the CYP3A4 enzyme, and grapefruit juice decreases metabolism of scopolamine, consequently increasing plasma concentration.

== Chemistry ==
=== Biosynthesis in plants ===
Scopolamine is among the secondary metabolites of plants from the Solanaceae (nightshade) family of plants, including henbane (Hyoscyamus niger), jimson weed (Datura), angel's trumpets (Brugmansia), deadly nightshade (Belladonna), mandrake (Mandragora officinarum), and corkwood (Duboisia).

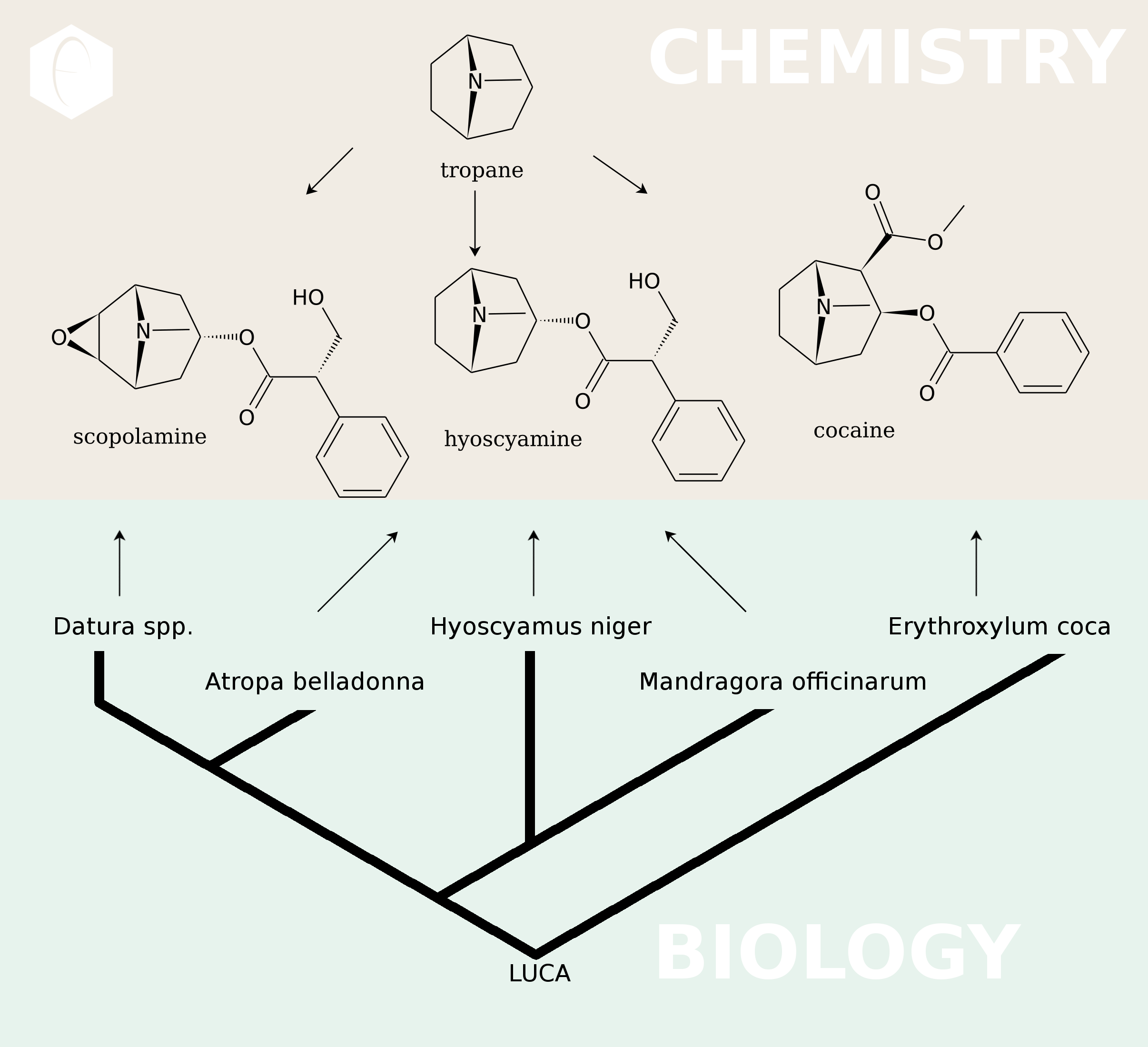
The biochemistry of tropane class compounds

The biosynthesis of scopolamine begins with the decarboxylation of L-ornithine to putrescine by ornithine decarboxylase. Putrescine is methylated to N-methylputrescine by putrescine N-methyltransferase.

A putrescine oxidase that specifically recognizes methylated putrescine catalyzes the deamination of this compound to 4-methylaminobutanal, which then undergoes a spontaneous ring formation to N-methyl-pyrrolium cation. In the next step, the pyrrolium cation condenses with acetoacetic acid yielding hygrine. No enzymatic activity could be demonstrated to catalyze this reaction. Hygrine further rearranges to tropinone.

Subsequently, tropinone reductase I converts tropinone to tropine, which condenses with phenylalanine-derived phenyllactate to littorine. A cytochrome P450 classified as Cyp80F1 oxidizes and rearranges littorine to hyoscyamine aldehyde. In the final step, hyoscyamine undergoes epoxidation catalyzed by 6β-hydroxyhyoscyamine epoxidase yielding scopolamine.

== History ==
Plants naturally containing scopolamine such as Atropa belladonna (deadly nightshade), Brugmansia (angels trumpet), Datura (Jimson weed), Hyoscyamus niger, Mandragora officinarum, Scopolia carniolica, Latua and Duboisia myoporoides have been known about and used for various purposes in both the New and Old Worlds since ancient times. Being one of the earlier alkaloids isolated from plant sources, scopolamine has been in use in its purified forms, such as various salts, including hydrochloride, hydrobromide, hydroiodide, and sulfate, since its official isolation by the German scientist Albert Ladenburg in 1880, and as various preparations from its plant-based form since antiquity and perhaps prehistoric times.

In 1899, Schneiderlin recommended the use of scopolamine and morphine for surgical anaesthesia, and it started to be used sporadically for that purpose. The use of this combination in obstetric anesthesiology (childbirth) was first proposed by Richard von Steinbuchel in 1902 and was picked up and further developed by Carl Gauss in Freiburg, Germany, starting in 1903. The method, which was based on a drug synergy between both scopolamine and morphine came to be known as Dämmerschlaf ("twilight sleep") or the "Freiburg method". It spread rather slowly, and different clinics experimented with different dosages and ingredients. In 1915, the Canadian Medical Association Journal reported, "the method [was] really still in a state of development". It remained widely used in the US until the 1960s, when growing chemophobia and a desire for more natural childbirth led to its abandonment.

== Society and culture ==
=== Names ===
Hyoscine hydrobromide is the international nonproprietary name, and scopolamine hydrobromide is the United States Adopted Name. Other names include levo-duboisine, devil's breath, and burundanga.

=== Australian bush medicine ===
A bush medicine developed by Aboriginal peoples of the eastern states of Australia from the soft corkwood tree (Duboisia myoporoides) was used by the Allies in World War II to stop soldiers from getting seasick when they sailed across the English Channel on their way to France during the Invasion of Normandy. Later, the same substance was found to be usable in the production of scopolamine and hyoscyamine, which are used in eye surgery, and a multimillion-dollar industry was built in Queensland based on this substance.

=== Recreational and religious use ===
While it has been occasionally used recreationally for its hallucinogenic properties, the experiences are often unpleasant, mentally and physically. It is also physically dangerous and officially classified as a deliriant drug, so repeated recreational use is rare. In June 2008, more than 20 people were hospitalized with psychosis in Norway after ingesting counterfeit flunitrazepam tablets containing scopolamine. In January 2018, 9 individuals were hospitalized in Perth, Western Australia, after reportedly ingesting scopolamine.

The alkaloid scopolamine, when taken recreationally for its psychoactive effect, is usually taken in the form of preparations from plants of the genera Datura or Brugmansia, often by adolescents or young adults in order to achieve hallucinations and an altered state of consciousness induced by muscarinic antagonism. In circumstances such as these, the intoxication is usually built on a synergistic, but even more toxic mixture of the additional alkaloids in the plants which includes atropine and hyoscyamine.

Historically, the various plants that produce scopolamine have been used psychoactively for spiritual and magical purposes, particularly by witches in western culture and indigenous groups throughout the Americas, such as Native American tribes like the Chumash. When entheogenic preparations of these plants were used, scopolamine was considered to be the main psychoactive compound and was largely responsible for the hallucinogenic effects, particularly when the preparation was made into a topical ointment, most notably flying ointment.

Scopolamine is reported to be the only active alkaloid within these plants that can effectively be absorbed through the skin to cause effects. Different recipes for these ointments were explored in European witchcraft at least as far back as the early modern period and included multiple ingredients to help with the transdermal absorption of scopolamine, such as animal fat, as well as other possible ingredients to counteract its noxious and dysphoric effects.

In the Bible, there are multiple mentions of Mandrake, a psychoactive and hallucinogenic plant root that contains scopolamine. It was associated with fertility and (sexual) desire for which it was yearned by Rachel, who was "barren" (infertile) but trying to conceive.

=== Interrogation ===
Investigations on potential use of scopolamine as a truth serum during interrogations were conducted in the early 20th century, and were ultimately dropped because of the side effects. In 2009, the Czechoslovak state security secret police were proven to have used scopolamine at least three times to obtain confessions from alleged antistate dissidents.

=== Use in crime ===
Ingestion of scopolamine can render a victim unconscious for 24 hours or more. In large doses, it can cause respiratory failure and death. The highest prevalence of misuse seems to be recorded in Colombia. Unofficial estimates there put the number of annual scopolamine incidents at approximately 50,000. A travel advisory published by the US Overseas Security Advisory Council (OSAC) in 2012 stated:

One common and particularly dangerous method that criminals use to rob a victim is through the use of drugs. Scopolamine is most often administered in liquid or powder form in foods and beverages. The majority of these incidents occur in nightclubs and bars, and victims - usually men, perceived to be wealthy - are targeted by young, attractive women. It is recommended that to avoid becoming a victim of scopolamine, a person should never accept food or beverages offered by strangers or new acquaintances, nor leave food or beverages unattended in their presence. Victims of scopolamine or other drugs should seek immediate medical attention.

Between 1998 and 2004, 13% of emergency-room admissions for "poisoning with criminal intentions" in a clinic of Bogotá have been attributed to scopolamine, and 44% to benzodiazepines. Most commonly, the person has been poisoned by a robber who gave the victim a scopolamine-laced beverage, in the hope that the victim would become unconscious or unable to effectively resist the robbery.

Beside robberies, it is also allegedly involved in express kidnappings and sexual assault. In 2008, the Hospital Clínic in Barcelona, Spain, introduced a protocol to help medical workers identify cases. In February 2015, Madrid hospitals adopted a similar working document. Hospital Clínic has found little scientific evidence to support this use and relies on the victims' stories to reach any conclusion.

Although poisoning by scopolamine appears quite often in the media as an aid for raping, kidnapping, killing, or robbery, the effects of this drug and the way it is applied by criminals (transdermal injection, on playing cards and papers, etc.) are often exaggerated, especially skin exposure, as the dose that can be absorbed by the skin is too low to have any effect. Scopolamine transdermal patches must be used for hours to days.

There are certain other aspects of the usage of scopolamine in crimes. Powdered scopolamine is referred to as "devil's breath". In popular media and television, it is portrayed as a method to brainwash or control people into being defrauded by their attackers. There is debate whether these claims are true.

== Research ==
Scopolamine is used as a research tool to study memory encoding. Initially, in human trials, relatively low doses of the muscarinic receptor antagonist scopolamine were found to induce temporary cognitive defects. Since then, scopolamine has become a standard drug for experimentally inducing cognitive defects in animals. Results in primates suggest that acetylcholine is involved in the encoding of new information into long-term memory. Scopolamine has been shown to exert a greater impairment on episodic memory, event-related potentials, memory retention and free recall compared to diphenhydramine (an anticholinergic and antihistamine).

Scopolamine produces detrimental effects on short-term memory, memory acquisition, learning, visual recognition memory, visuospatial praxis, visuospatial memory, visuoperceptual function, verbal recall, and psychomotor speed. It does not seem to impair recognition and memory retrieval, though. Acetylcholine projections in hippocampal neurons, which are vital in mediating long-term potentiation, are inhibited by scopolamine. Scopolamine inhibits cholinergic-mediated glutamate release in hippocampal neurons, which assist in depolarization, potentiation of action potential, and synaptic suppression. Scopolamine's effects on acetylcholine and glutamate release in the hippocampus favor retrieval-dominant cognitive functioning. Scopolamine has been used to model the defects in cholinergic function for models of Alzheimer's, dementia, fragile X syndrome, and Down syndrome.

Scopolamine has been identified as a psychoplastogen, which refers to a compound capable of promoting rapid and sustained neuroplasticity in a single dose. It has been and continues to be investigated as a rapid-onset antidepressant, with many small studies finding positive results, particularly in female subjects.

NASA agreed to develop a nasal administration method. With a precise dosage, the NASA spray formulation has been shown to work faster and more reliably than the oral form to treat motion sickness. NASA has also developed a medication called Scop-Dex that combines 0.8 mg of scopolamine with 10 mg of dextroamphetamine to treat motion sickness and space adaptation syndrome.

Although a fair amount of research has been applied to scopolamine in the field of medicine, its hallucinogenic (psychoactive) effects as well as the psychoactive effects of other antimuscarinic deliriants have not been extensively researched or as well understood compared to other types of hallucinogens such as psychedelic and dissociative compounds, despite the alkaloid's long history of usage in mind-altering plant preparations.

== See also ==
- Cimetropium bromide (made from scopolamine)
- Oxitropium (made from norscopolamine)
