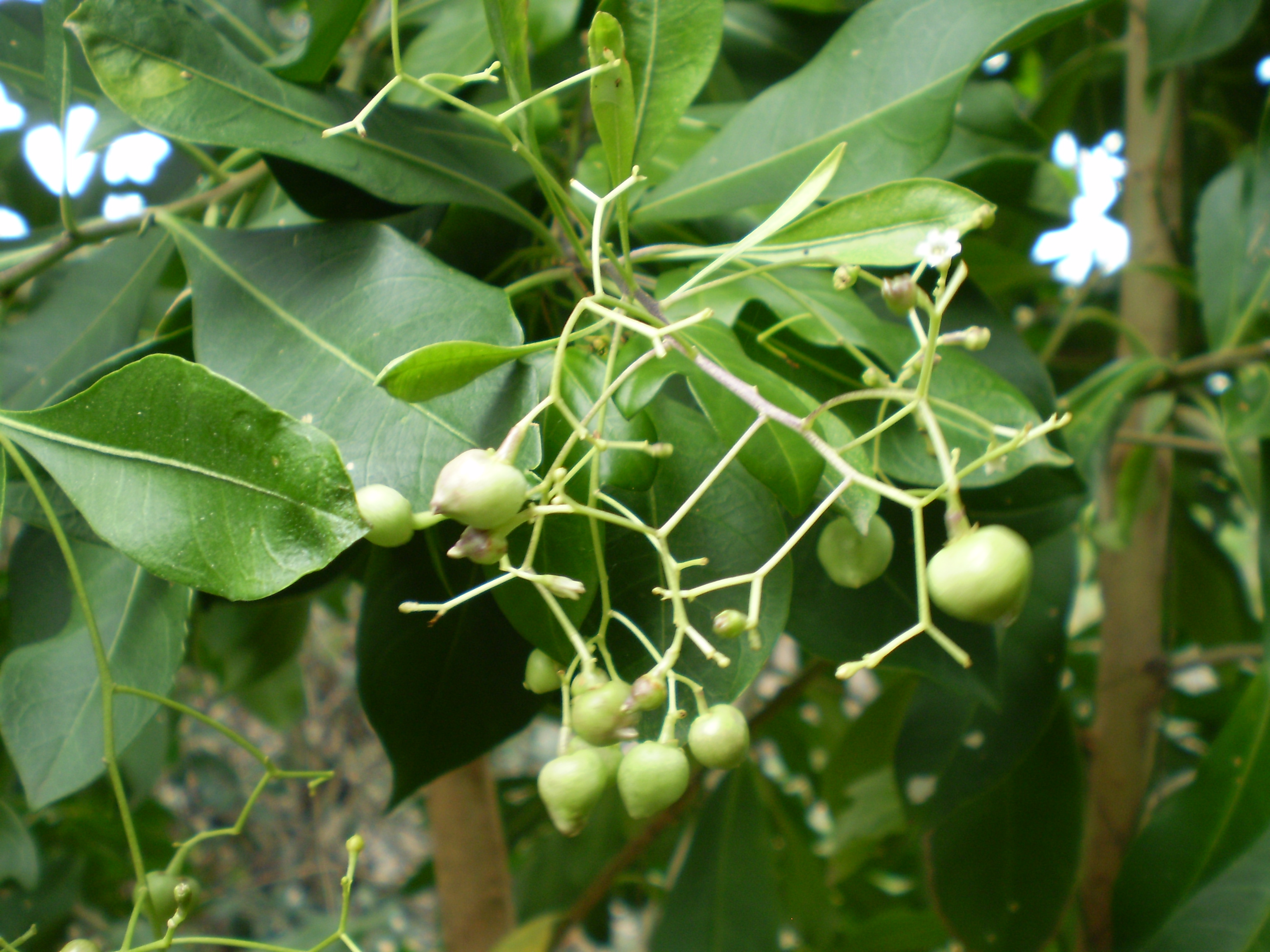

Conservation status
- Least Concern (IUCN 3.1)

Scientific classification
- Kingdom: Plantae
- Clade: Tracheophytes
- Clade: Angiosperms
- Clade: Eudicots
- Clade: Asterids
- Order: Solanales
- Family: Solanaceae
- Genus: Duboisia
- Species: D. myoporoides

Binomial name
- Duboisia myoporoides R.Br.

Synonyms
- Myoporum paniculatum Kraenzl.; Entrecasteauxia elliptica Montrouz.

= Duboisia myoporoides =

Corkwood

Species of plant

Duboisia myoporoides, or corkwood, is a shrub or tree native to New Caledonia and to high-rainfall areas on the margins of rainforest in eastern Australia. It has a thick and corky bark. The leaves are obovate to elliptic in shape, 4–15 cm long and 1–4 cm wide. The small white flowers are produced in clusters. This is followed by globose purple-black berries (not edible).

== Uses ==
The leaves are a commercial source of pharmaceutically useful alkaloids. The same alkaloids render all plant parts poisonous. The leaves contain a number of alkaloids, including hyoscine (scopolamine), used for treating motion sickness, stomach disorders, and the side effects of cancer therapy.

A bush medicine developed by Aboriginal peoples of the eastern states of Australia from the tree was used by the Allies in World War II to stop soldiers getting seasick when they sailed across the English Channel during the Invasion of Normandy. Later, it was found that the same substance could be used in the production of scopolamine and hyoscyamine, which are used in eye surgery, and a multi-million dollar industry was built in Queensland based on this substance.

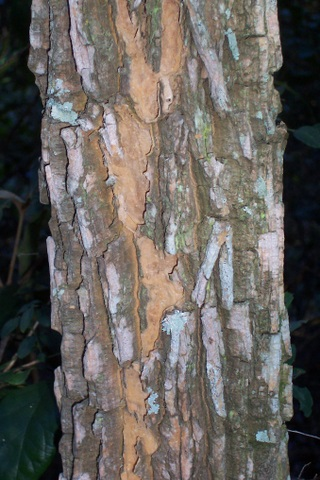
Duboisia myoporoides bark at Wyrrabalong National Park, Australia

== Chemical composition ==
It mostly contains tropane alkaloids. Scopolamine and atropine are major alkaloids of this tree. Other alkaloids include hyoscyamine, norhyoscyamine, tigloidine, valtropine, tiglyoxytropine.

== Further literature ==
- Foley, Paul (2006). "Duboisia myoporoides: the medical career of a native Australian plant". Historical Records of Australian Science. 17 (1): 31–69. doi:10.1071/hr06001.
