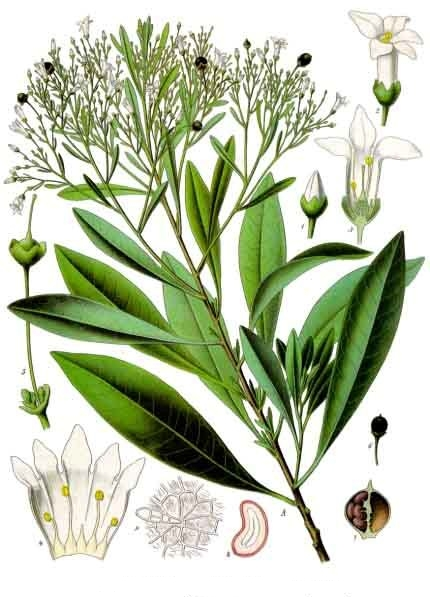
- Duboisia myoporoides

Scientific classification
- Kingdom: Plantae
- Clade: Tracheophytes
- Clade: Angiosperms
- Clade: Eudicots
- Clade: Asterids
- Order: Solanales
- Family: Solanaceae
- Subfamily: Nicotianoideae
- Tribe: Anthocercideae
- Genus: Duboisia; R.Br.

Type species
- Duboisia myoporoides R.Br. 1802

Species
- Duboisia arenitensis Craven, Lepschi & Haegi; Duboisia hopwoodii (F.Muell.) F.Muell.; Duboisia leichhardtii (F.Muell.) F.Muell.; Duboisia myoporoides R.Br. 1802

= Duboisia =

Genus of plants

The orchid genus described by Karsten as Duboisia is now included in Myoxanthus. For the prehistoric antelope genus, see Duboisia (antelope).

Duboisia (commonly called corkwood tree) is a genus of small perennial shrubs and trees that grow up to 14 metres (46 feet) tall, with extremely light wood and a thick corky bark. There are four species; all occur in Australia, and one also occurs in New Caledonia.

The alternate, glabrous leaves are narrow and elliptical. The inflorescence is an open cymose panicle of apically small white flowers, sometimes with a purple or mauve striped tube. They flower profusely in spring. The fruit is a small, globular, black, juicy berry.

Aboriginal Australians sometimes chew the nicotine-containing leaves of Duboisia hopwoodii mixed with wood ash for their stimulant and, after extended use, depressant effects. The leaves of Duboisia leichhardtii and Duboisia myoporoides also contain scopolamine and hyoscyamine, along with some other pharmaceutically important alkaloids. A derivative of scopolamine is the drug butylscopolamine, a potent peripherally acting antispasmodic. These trees are commercially grown for the pharmaceutical industry.

The genus was named by Robert Brown in honour of Louis DuBois who wrote Méthode éprouvée, avec laquelle on peut parvenir facilement et sans maître à connaître les plantes de l'intérieur de la France et en particulier celles des environs d'Orléans, par M. Dubois, théologal de l'église d'Orléans, ancien démonstrateur du Jardin des plantes (1803).
