= Tryptophan 2-monooxygenase =

Class of enzymes

Identifiers
- EC no.: 1.13.12.3
- CAS no.: 37256-65-8

Databases
- IntEnz: IntEnz view
- BRENDA: BRENDA entry
- ExPASy: NiceZyme view
- KEGG: KEGG entry
- MetaCyc: metabolic pathway
- PRIAM: profile
- PDB structures: RCSB PDB PDBe PDBsum
- Gene Ontology: AmiGO / QuickGO
Search
- PMC: articles
- PubMed: articles
- NCBI: proteins

Tryptophan 2-monooxygenase (EC 1.13.12.3) is an enzyme that catalyzes the chemical reaction

tryptophan
O_{2}
CO_{2} + H_{2}O
3-indoleacetamide

The two substrates of this enzyme are L-tryptophan and oxygen. Its products are 3-indoleacetamide, carbon dioxide, and water.

This enzyme belongs to the family of oxidoreductases, specifically those acting on single donors with O_{2} as oxidant and incorporation of two atoms of oxygen into the substrate (oxygenases). The oxygen incorporated need not be derived from O with incorporation of one atom of oxygen (internal monooxygenases o internal mixed-function oxidases). The systematic name of this enzyme class is L-tryptophan:oxygen 2-oxidoreductase (decarboxylating). This enzyme participates in tryptophan metabolism, especially in plants, where the product amide can be converted to the auxin hormone indole-3-acetic acid.

Like other similar enzymes which use oxygen to cleave amino acids, this is a flavoprotein. Others include lysine 2-monooxygenase and arginine 2-monooxygenase.
