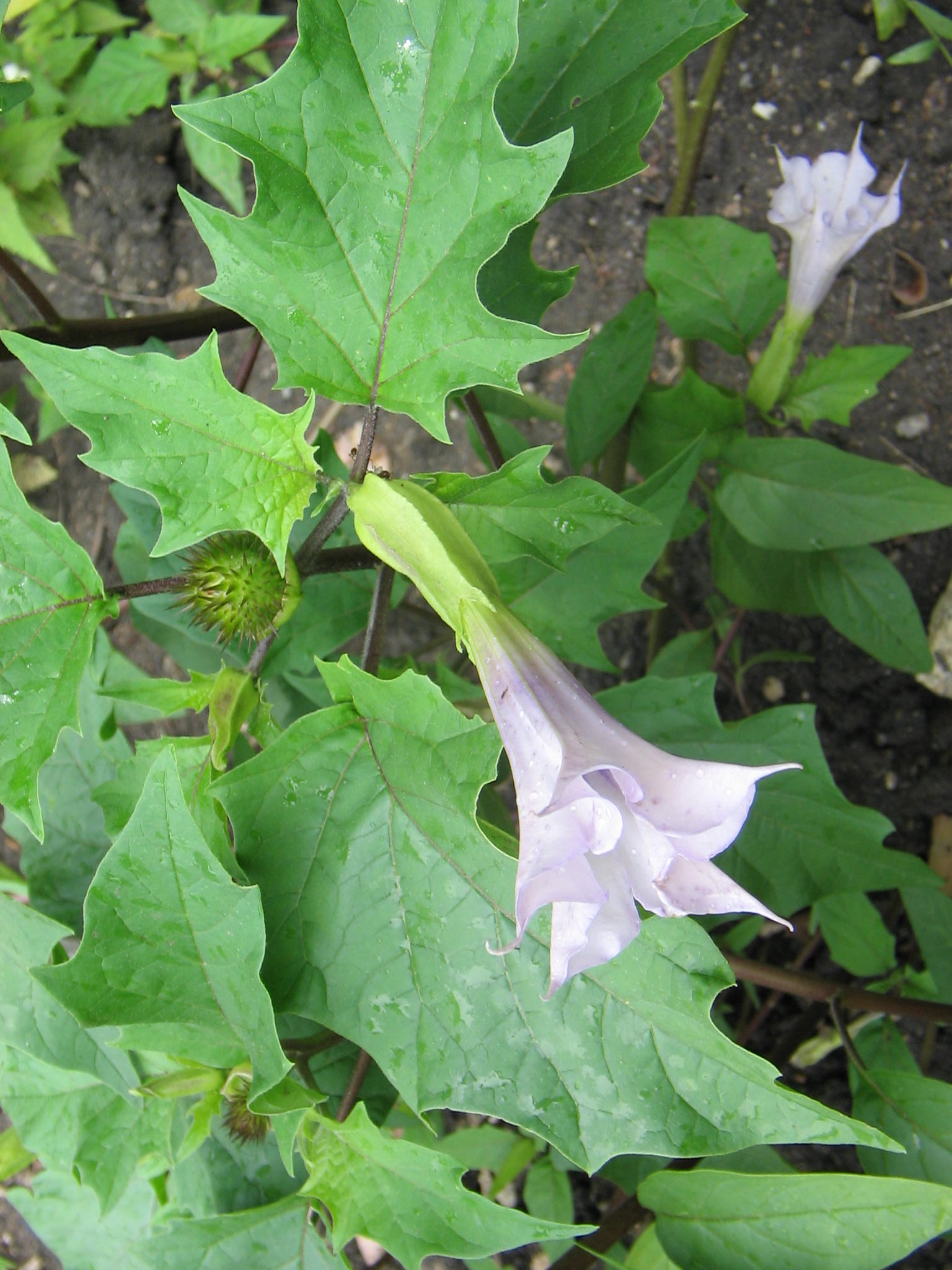

Scientific classification
- Kingdom: Plantae
- Clade: Tracheophytes
- Clade: Angiosperms
- Clade: Eudicots
- Clade: Asterids
- Order: Solanales
- Family: Solanaceae
- Genus: Datura
- Species: D. stramonium

Binomial name
- Datura stramonium L.

Synonyms
- Synonymy: Datura bernhardii (Lundstr.); Datura bertolonii (Parl. ex Guss.); Datura cabanesii (P.Fourn.); Datura capensis (Bernh.); Datura ferocissima (Cabanès & P.Fourn.); Datura ferox (Nees 1834 not L. 1756); Datura hybrida (Ten.); Datura inermis (Juss. ex Jacq.); Datura laevis (L.f.); Datura loricata (Sieber ex Bernh.); Datura lurida (Salisb.); Datura microcarpa (Godr.); Datura muricata (Godr. 1873 not Bernh. 1818 nor Link 1821); Datura parviflora (Salisb.); Datura praecox (Godr.); Datura pseudostramonium (Sieber ex Bernh.); Datura tatula (L.); Datura wallichii (Dunal); Stramonium foetidum (Scop.); Stramonium laeve (Moench); Stramonium spinosum (Lam.); Stramonium tatula (Moench); Stramonium vulgare (Moench); Stramonium vulgatum (Gaertn.)

= Datura stramonium =

Jimsonweed

Species of flowering plant in the nightshade family

Datura stramonium, known by the common names thornapple, jimsonweed (jimson weed) or stink blade, is a poisonous flowering plant in the Daturae tribe of the nightshade family Solanaceae. Its likely origin was in Central America, and it has been introduced in many world regions. It is an aggressive invasive weed in temperate climates and tropical climates across the world. D. stramonium has frequently been employed in traditional medicine to treat a variety of ailments. It has also been used as a hallucinogen (of the anticholinergic/antimuscarinic, deliriant type), taken entheogenically to cause intense, sacred or occult visions. It is unlikely to become a major drug of abuse owing to effects upon both mind and body frequently perceived as being highly unpleasant, giving rise to a state of profound and long-lasting disorientation or delirium (anticholinergic syndrome) with a potentially fatal outcome. It contains tropane alkaloids which are responsible for the psychoactive effects, and may be severely toxic.

== Description ==
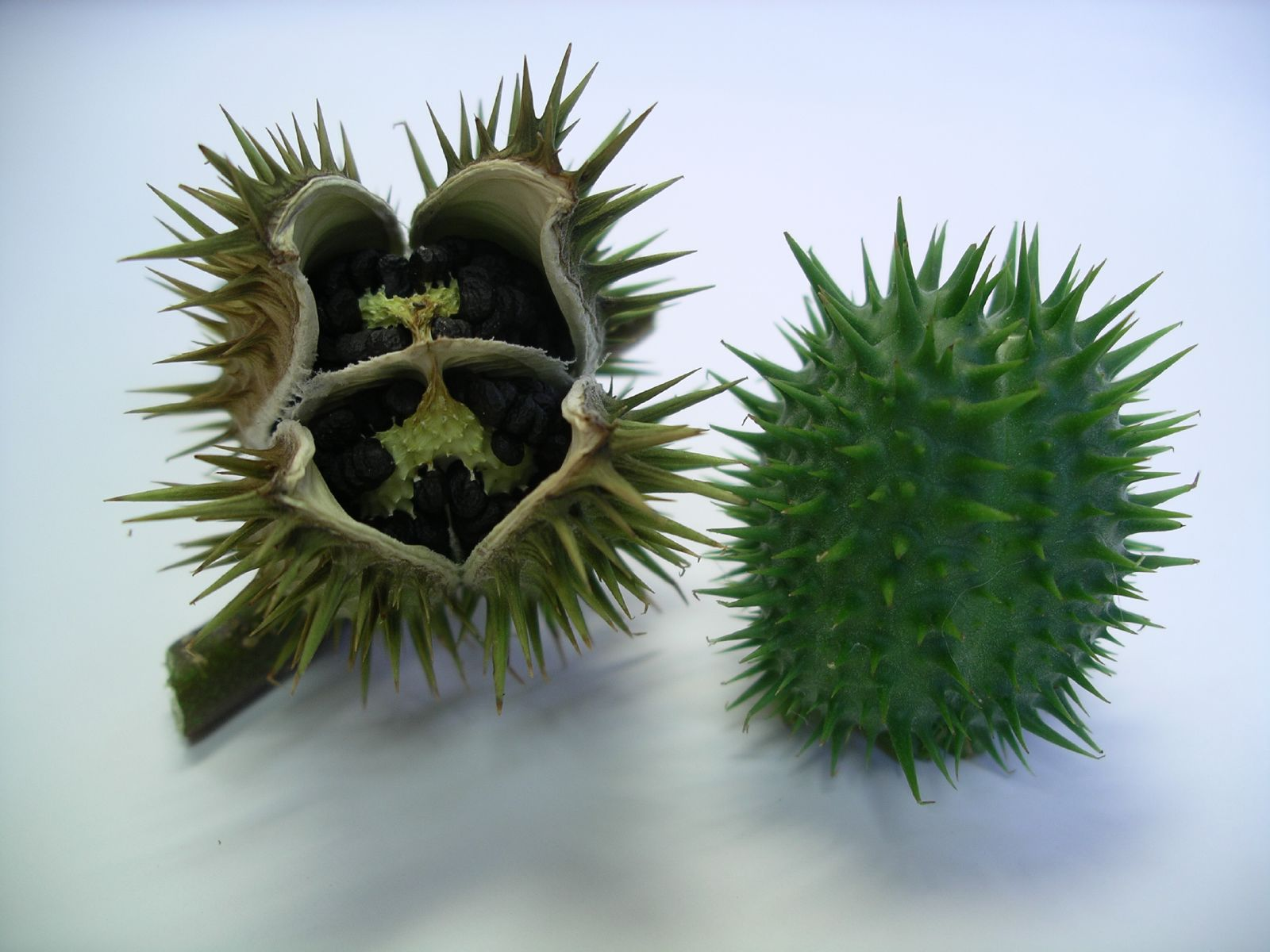
Mature (left) and immature (right) seed capsules

Datura stramonium is an erect, annual, freely branching herb that forms a bush 60 to 150 cm (2 to 5 ft) tall.

The root is long, thick, fibrous, and white. The stem is stout, erect, leafy, smooth, and pale yellow-green to reddish purple in color. The stem forks off repeatedly into branches and each fork forms a leaf and a single, erect flower.

The leaves are about 8 to 20 cm (3–8 in) long, smooth, toothed, soft, and irregularly undulated. The upper surface of the leaves is a darker green, and the bottom is a light green. The leaves have a bitter and nauseating taste, which is imparted to extracts of the herb, and remains even after the leaves have been dried.

Datura stramonium generally flowers throughout the summer. The fragrant flowers have a pleasing odour; are trumpet-shaped, white to creamy or violet, and 6 to 9 cm (2 1/2–3 1/2 in) long; and grow on short stems from either the axils of the leaves or the places where the branches fork. The calyx is long and tubular, swollen at the bottom, and sharply angled, surmounted by five sharp teeth. The corolla, which is folded and only partially open, is white, funnel-shaped, and has prominent ribs. The flowers open at night, emitting a pleasant fragrance, and are fed upon by nocturnal moths.

The egg-shaped seed capsule is 3 to 8 cm (1–3 in) in diameter and either covered with spines or bald. At maturity, it splits into four chambers, each with dozens of small, black seeds.

== Etymology and common names ==
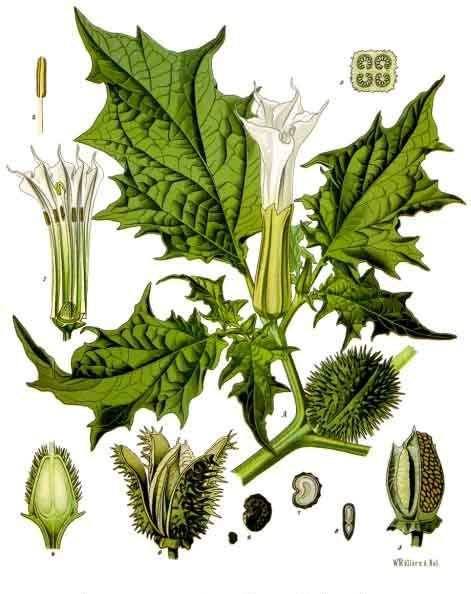

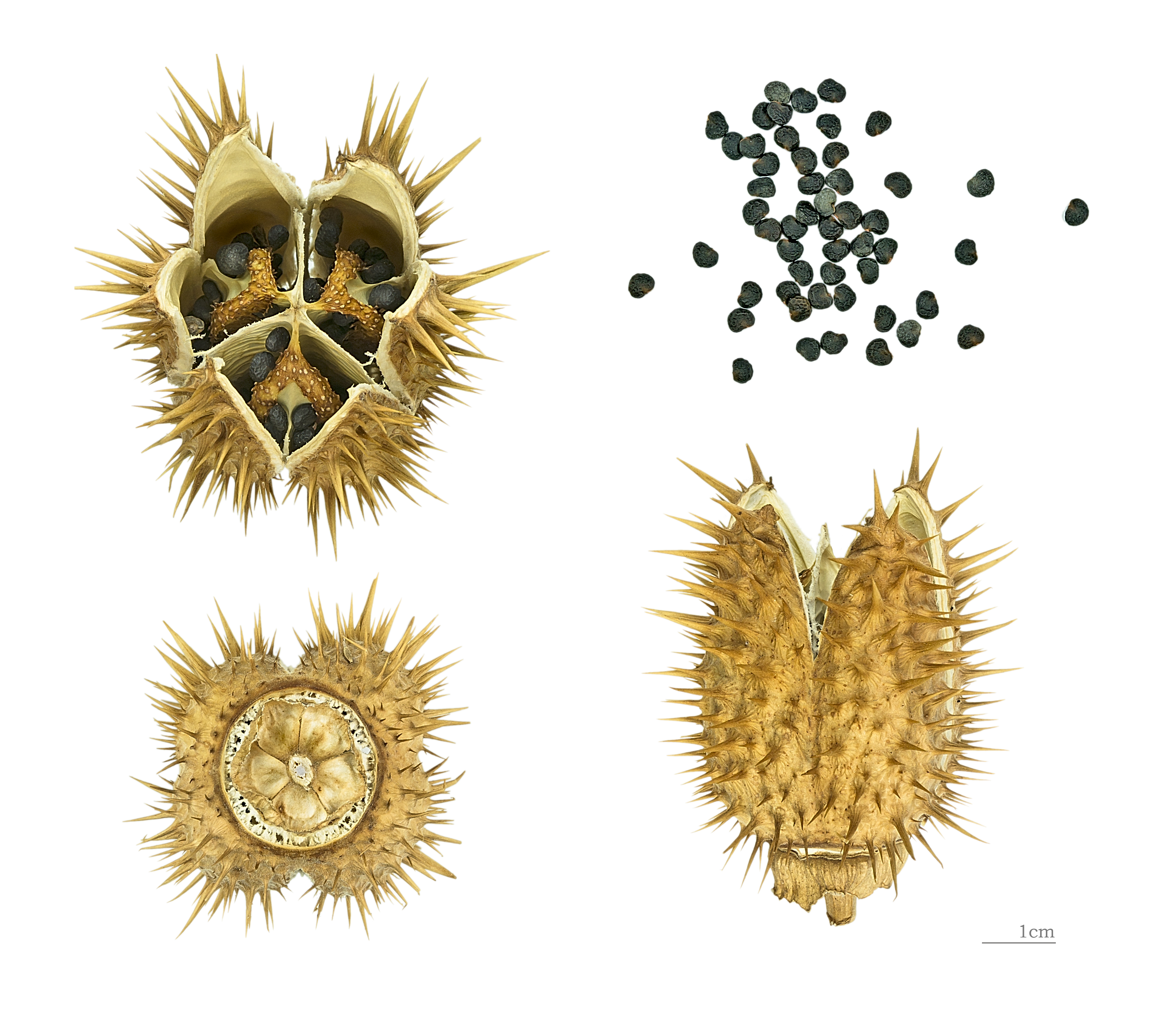
Fruits and seeds – MHNT

The genus name is derived from the plant's Hindi name, dhatūra, ultimately from Sanskrit dhattūra, 'white thorn-apple'. The origin of Neo-Latin stramonium is unknown; the name Stramonia was used in the 17th century for various Datura species. There is some evidence that Stramonium is originally from Greek στρύχνον, 'nightshade' and μανικόν, 'which makes mad'. It is called ummetta (ఉమ్మెత్త) in Telugu, and umathai (ஊமத்தை) in Tamil; both of which are believed to have derived from the Sanskrit word unmatta (उन्मत्तः), meaning 'mad' or 'insane'.

In the United States, the plant is commonly known as "Jimsonweed" (or, more rarely, "Jamestown weed"). This name derives from Jamestown, Virginia, where soldiers sent to suppress Bacon's Rebellion in the English colony of Virginia reportedly consumed the plant and spent eleven days in altered mental states:

The James-Town Weed (which resembles the Thorny Apple of Peru, and I take to be the plant so call'd) is supposed to be one of the greatest coolers in the world. This being an early plant, was gather'd very young for a boil'd salad, by some of the soldiers sent thither to quell the rebellion of Bacon; and some of them ate plentifully of it, the effect of which was a very pleasant comedy, for they turned natural fools upon it for several days: one would blow up a feather in the air; another would dart straws at it with much fury; and another, stark naked, was sitting up in a corner like a monkey, grinning and making mows [grimaces] at them; a fourth would fondly kiss and paw his companions, and sneer in their faces with a countenance more antic than any in a Dutch droll.

In this frantic condition they were confined, lest they should, in their folly, destroy themselves—though it was observed that all their actions were full of innocence and good nature. Indeed, they were not very cleanly; for they would have wallowed in their own excrements if they had not been prevented. A thousand such simple tricks they played, and after eleven days returned themselves again, not remembering anything that had passed.

— Robert Beverley Jr., The History and Present State of Virginia, Book II: Of the Natural Product and Conveniencies in Its Unimprov'd State, Before the English Went Thither, 1705

Common names for Datura stramonium vary by region, and include thornapple, moon flower, hell's bells, devil's trumpet, devil's weed, tolguacha, Jamestown weed, stink blade, locoweed, pricklyburr, false castor oil plant, and devil's cucumber.

== Range and habitat ==
Datura stramonium is native to Central America, but was spread widely to the Old World early where it has also become naturalized. It was scientifically described and named by Swedish botanist Carl Linnaeus in 1753, although it had been described a century earlier by botanists such as Nicholas Culpeper. Today, it grows wild in all the world's warm and temperate regions, where it is found along roadsides and at dung-rich livestock enclosures. In Europe, it is found as a weed in garbage dumps and wastelands, and is toxic to animals consuming it. In South Africa, it is colloquially known by the Afrikaans name malpitte ('mad seeds').

Through observation, the seed is thought to be carried by birds and spread in their droppings. Its seeds can lie dormant underground for years and germinate when the soil is disturbed. The Royal Horticultural Society has advised worried gardeners to dig it up or have it otherwise removed, while wearing gloves to handle it.

== Toxicity ==
All parts of Datura plants contain dangerous levels of the tropane alkaloids atropine, hyoscyamine, and scopolamine, all of which are classified as deliriants, or anticholinergics. The risk of fatal overdose is high among uninformed users, and many hospitalizations occur among recreational users who ingest the plant for its psychoactive effects. Deliberate or inadvertent poisoning resulting from smoking jimsonweed and other related species has been reported. Numerous other alkaloids have been detected at lower levels in the plant including methylecgonine in the roots, apoatropine in the stems, leaves, and other parts, and tropine in the flowers and other parts.

The amount of toxins varies widely from plant to plant. As much as a 20:1 variation can be found between plants, and a given plant's toxicity depends on its age, where it is growing, and the local weather conditions. A particularly strong difference has been found between plants growing in their native ranges and plants that have adjusted to growing in non-native ranges: in the latter, the atropine and scopolamine concentration may be up to 20–40 times lower than in the native range. It is suspected that this is an evolutionary response to lower predatory pressures. Additionally, within a given plant, toxin concentration varies by part and even from leaf to leaf. When the plant is younger, the ratio of scopolamine to atropine is about 3:1; after flowering, this ratio is reversed, with the amount of scopolamine continuing to decrease as the plant gets older. In traditional cultures, a great deal of experience and detailed knowledge of Datura was critical to minimize harm. An individual seed contains about 0.1 mg of atropine, and the approximate fatal dose for adult humans is >10 mg atropine or >2–4 mg scopolamine.

Recently a rodent study investigating a methanolic extract derived from the whole plant reported significant behavioural and neurochemical effects. The extract induced memory deficits, along with anxiogenic and depressive-like behaviours. These effects were associated with elevated lipid peroxidation and a marked depletion of antioxidant enzymes in the brain. Histological analysis revealed disrupted neuronal morphology in the hippocampus and medial prefrontal cortex, providing evidence suggestive of the plant's neurotoxic potential.

Datura intoxication typically produces delirium, hallucination, hyperthermia, tachycardia, bizarre behavior, urinary retention, and severe mydriasis, with resultant painful photophobia that can last several days. Pronounced amnesia is another commonly reported effect. The onset of symptoms generally occurs around 30 to 60 minutes after ingesting the herb. These symptoms generally last from 24 to 48 hours, but have been reported in some cases to last as long as two weeks.

As with other cases of anticholinergic poisoning, intravenous physostigmine can be administered in severe cases as an antidote.

=== Natural defenses ===
These chemical production responses present in Datura stramonium function as a natural defense for the plant against dangers. Such dangers can range from biotic factors such as herbivores, pathogens, viruses, fungi and oomycetes to abiotic conditions such as drought, light, temperature, and nutrient deprivation. Datura stramonium can adjust to all these conditions through protein activity that is correlated with specific domains. Examples of this are terpenoid production to target herbivores present in multiple sites and abiotic stress responses. The abiotic responses are driven primarily by protein kinase regulatory subunits which are over-represented, expanded, and positively selected. These traits also show signs of physicochemical divergence, which put emphasis on the plant's overall adaptability. In addition to this, terpenoids play a key role in mediating plant defense responses, as they trigger terpene metabolite activity. Such activity has the effect of defending against herbivore damage through a sulfakinin (SK) domain that reduces sensitivity of taste receptors for certain insects that come into contact with the plant. Additionally, terpenoids serve as attractants for carnivorous entities that would then attack these same herbivores. Gene domains relating to this immune response have been seen in positively selected and expanded proteins in Datura stramonium. Overall, these compounds target the central nervous systems of organisms that ingest them, to deter the herbivorous behavior. Terpenoids are also used for plant-to-plant communication, which could be used for a community-wide threat response. Datura stramonium also features leaf trichomes as a defensive trait to prevent herbivory.

The physiology of the plant itself is important for understanding patterns of defense as its status as an annual plant limits opportunities for biomass regrowth post-destruction, due to its inability to engage regrowth meristems. This results in the leaves being susceptible to injury from even small instances of attacks. To compensate, they have a large initial size for redundancy. These leaves also have a greater longevity and ability to metabolize even when damaged. However, the way these plants have evolved to display these characteristics differs from traditional defense mechanisms, as Datura stramonium uses a combination of both resistance and growth simultaneously to address these issues, instead of relying exclusively on one or the other. It has been hypothesized that this is due to the fact that these two methods have no negative correlation between them in experimental conditions. However, resource limitations may result in a tradeoff between one method of defense versus the other. In addition, herbivores are not solely the driving force that triggers these responses within the plant. Another factor that impacts behavior is the fact that due to the wide habitat range, a number of different, region-specific response patterns have been observed. However, these defensive responses have been observed to have varying impacts on growth and fitness when put to the test against predators. Studies in ecological reserves have shown that herbivore presence can either increase or decrease plant growth, fitness, and resistance. These results can be attributed to the significant genetic variation of the individual variants present in testing.

=== Regional variation ===
The Datura genus itself has seen little research done in regards to its various genomic sequences. As such, it is difficult to track the evolution of its traits (aside from a few instances of model species), which results in a limited understanding of how it has evolved to adapt to various environmental conditions. However, some limited studies have been done into Datura diversity. Datura stramonium diverged from the rest of the Datura genus around 30 million years ago. This terminal branch has the most rapidly significant, evolving gene families compared to other members of the Solanaceae family. The most recent contractions in the tree also correspond with the most recent common ancestor of the Datura species clade. However, the subspecies of Datura stramonium tend to vary greatly in regards to both gene family contractions and expansions. Variables such as immunity, response to abiotic stress, and defense against biotic threats determine gene expansion signaling, positive selection, and physicochemical divergence. Despite this, Datura genomes have high amounts of repetitive DNA elements even compared to other Solanaceae species' genomes, in addition to a recent, yet independent surge in retrotransposon expansion. Major genomic variations have been witnessed, most likely through the rapid spread of the plant's range due to human behavior. An example of this is a 59-fold difference in tropane alkaloid concentration present in different regions of Mexico. Datura stramonium regional variants have been observed to have an overall similar genome size to each other.

=== Tropane alkaloid evolution and implementation ===
Tropane alkaloid biosynthesis is another avenue of defense with codons positively selected and expanded in the Datura branch. It is aided by the tropane alkaloid littorine rearrangement which is very important to scopolamine and atropine/hyoscyamine production, all of which serve to debilitate any organism that would come into contact with them. Datura stramonium has the highest tropane alkaloid production level in all the Solanaceae family, with scopolamine, atropine, and anisodamine being the primary tropane alkaloids found in the plant that inhibit neurotransmitters. The pmt gene family responsible for tropane alkaloid development has been observed to have significant gene expansion in the Datura genus evolution. The last common ancestor had only one gene copy, while modern variants have a range of three to two present, which results in higher mutation rates for traits involved with these various alkaloids. Use of tropane alkaloids, however, has had development spread out around many angiosperm families and evolutionary distances. Their presence has been reported to have arisen multiple times in Solanaceae lineages, some instances of which being independent of each other. This gives credence to the same diversification of tropane alkaloid production witnessed in the Datura stramonium regional variants. Another aspect of these varying Solanaceae lineages is that enzymes from completely different protein groups have been observed to be utilized to form similar biosynthesis reactions. In addition to this, differing protein folds and domain expressions correlate to different levels of tropane alkaloid production.

=== Poisoning incidents ===
In Australia in December 2022, around 200 people reported becoming ill after eating products containing spinach, sold mostly through Costco. Datura stramonium was identified as the contaminant, whose young leaves had been picked alongside the spinach leaves. The weed had spread due to increased rainfall. The grower, Riviera Farms, is from the Gippsland region of Victoria, and acted promptly to eradicate the weed.

== Uses ==
=== Traditional medicine ===
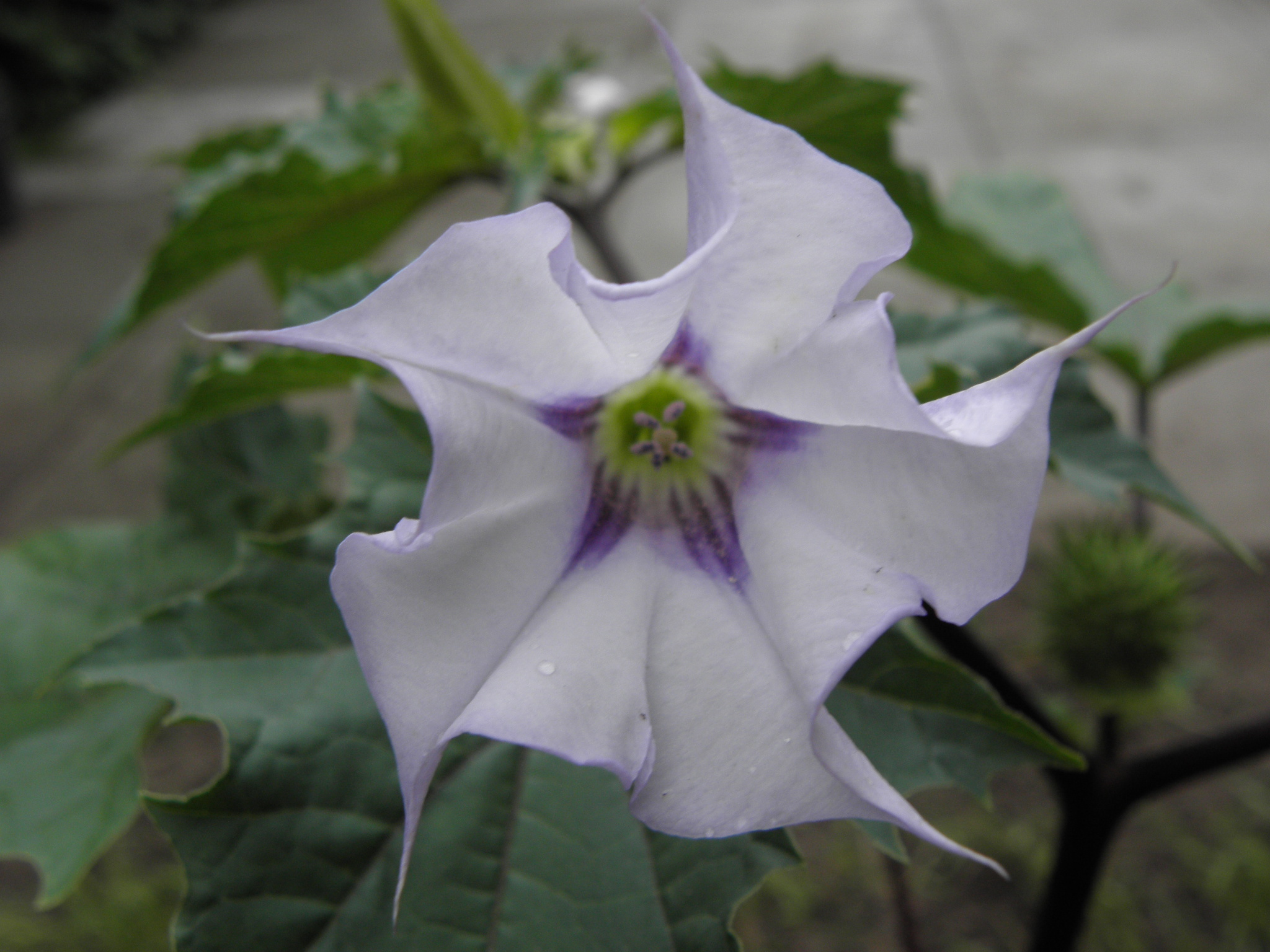
D. stramonium var. tatula, flower (front)

One of the primary active agents in Datura is atropine, which has been used in traditional medicine and for recreation over centuries. The leaves are generally smoked, either in a cigarette or a pipe.

During the late 18th century, James Anderson, the English Physician General of the East India Company, learned of the practice and popularized it in Europe. The Chinese also used it as a form of anesthesia during surgery.

=== Early folk medicine ===
John Gerard's Herball (1597) states,

[T]he juice of Thornapple, boiled with hog's grease, cureth all inflammations whatsoever, all manner of burnings and scaldings, as well of fire, water, boiling lead, gunpowder, as that which comes by lightning and that in very short time, as myself have found in daily practice, to my great credit and profit.

William Lewis reported, in the late 18th century, that the juice could be made into "a very powerful remedy in various convulsive and spasmodic disorders, epilepsy and mania," and was also "found to give ease in external inflammations and haemorrhoids".

Henry Hyde Salter discusses D. stramonium as a treatment for asthma in his 19th-century work On Asthma: its Pathology and Treatment. Smoking of herbs, including D. stramonium, was thought to provide relief for asthmatics since antiquity and into the early 20th century. The use of smoking D. stramonium to treat asthma would later wane following new understandings of asthma as an allergic inflammatory reaction, and developments in pharmacology that provided more effective treatments.

=== Spiritualism and the occult ===
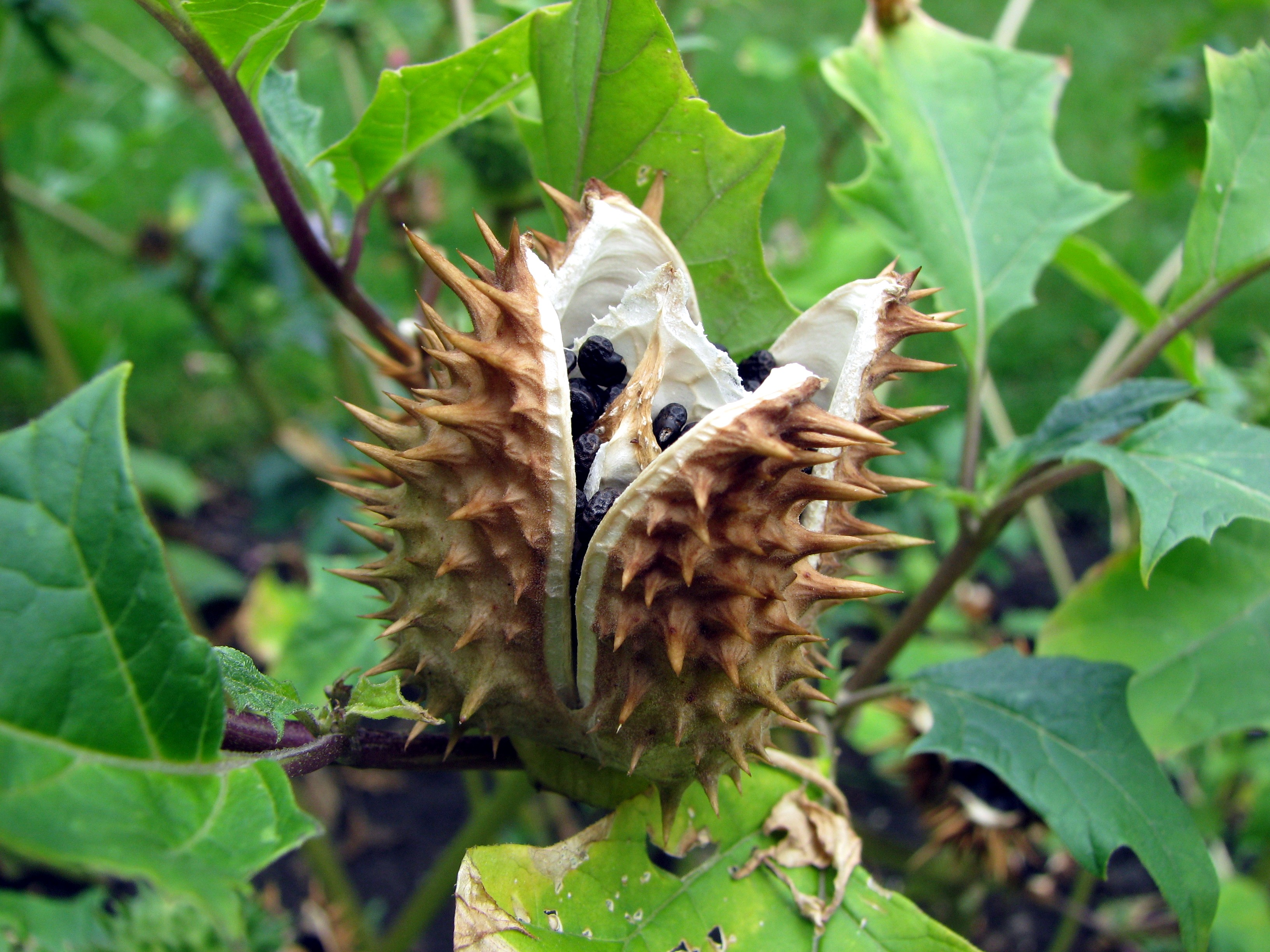
Seed capsule, showing dehiscence of the four valves to release seeds

Across the Americas, indigenous peoples such as the Algonquian, Aztecs, Navajo, Cherokee, Luiseño and the indigenous peoples of Marie-Galante used this plant or other Datura species in sacred ceremonies for its hallucinogenic properties. In Ethiopia, some students and debtrawoch (lay priests), use D. stramonium to "open the mind" to be more receptive to learning, and creative and imaginative thinking.

The common name "datura" has its origins in India, where the sister species Datura metel is considered particularly sacred – believed to be a favorite of Shiva in Shaivism. Both Datura stramonium and D. metel have reportedly been used by some sadhus and charnel ground ascetics, such as the Aghori, as both an entheogen and ritual poison. It was sometimes mixed with cannabis, as well as highly poisonous plants like Aconitum ferox, to intentionally create dysphoric experiences. The ascetics have used unpleasant or toxic plants such as these in order to achieve spiritual liberation (moksha), in settings of extreme horror and discomfort.

Among its visionary purposes, jimsonweed also garnered a reputation for supposed magical uses in various cultures throughout history. In his book, The Serpent and the Rainbow, Wade Davis identified D. stramonium, called "zombi cucumber" in Haiti, as a central ingredient of the concoction vodou priests use to create zombies. However, it has been noted that the process of zombification is not directly performed by vodou priests of the loa but rather by bokors. In European witchcraft, D. stramonium was also supposedly a common ingredient used for making witches' flying ointment along with other poisonous plants of the nightshade family. It was often responsible for the hallucinogenic effects of magical or lycanthropic salves and potions. During the witch-phobia craze in Early Modern times in England and parts of the colonial Northeastern United States, it was often considered unlucky or inappropriate to grow the plant in one's garden, as it was considered to be an aid to incantations.

== Cultivation ==
Datura stramonium prefers rich, calcareous soil. Adding nitrogen fertilizer to the soil increases the concentration of alkaloids present in the plant. D. stramonium can be grown from seed, which is sown with several feet between plants. It is sensitive to frost, so should be sheltered during cold weather. The plant is harvested when the fruits are ripe, but still green. To harvest, the entire plant is cut down, the leaves are stripped from the plant, and everything is left to dry. When the fruits begin to burst open, the seeds are harvested. For intensive plantations, leaf yields of 1,100 to 1,700 kilograms per hectare (1,000 to 1,500 lb/acre) and seed yields of 780 kg/ha (700 lb/acre) are possible.
