= C16H19NO4 =

The molecular formula C_{16}H_{19}NO_{4} may refer to:

- Benzoylecgonine, the main metabolite of cocaine
- Norcocaine, a minor metabolite of cocaine
- Norscopolamine, a tropane alkaloid isolated from Atropanthe sinensis
