= Norscopolamine =

Names
- IUPAC name [(1R,2R,4S,5S)-3-Oxa-9-azatricyclo[3.3.1.02,4]nonan-7-yl] (2S)-3-hydroxy-2-phenylpropanoate
- Other names Norhyoscine

Identifiers
CAS Number	4684-28-0
3D model (JSmol)	Interactive image
ChemSpider	58815982
ECHA InfoCard	100.022.853
EC Number	225-139-6
PubChem CID	92989
UNII	G880Z17K5S
CompTox Dashboard (EPA)	DTXSID30963679
- InChI: InChI=1S/C16H19NO4/c18-8-11(9-4-2-1-3-5-9)16(19)20-10-6-12-14-15(21-14)13(7-10)17-12/h1-5,10-15,17-18H,6-8H2/t10?,11-,12-,13+,14-,15+/m1/s1 Key: MOYZEMOPQDTDHA-YQYZCKNZSA-N
- SMILES: C1[C@@H]2[C@@H]3[C@@H](O3)[C@@H](N2)CC1OC(=O)[C@H](CO)C4=CC=CC=C4

Properties
Chemical formula	C_{16}H_{19}NO_{4}
Molar mass	289.331 g·mol^{−1}
- Except where otherwise noted, data are given for materials in their standard state (at 25 °C [77 °F], 100 kPa). Infobox references

Norscopolamine is a tropane alkaloid isolated from Atropanthe sinensis.

Norscopolamine is used in the synthesis of Oxitropium.

== See also ==
- Aposcopolamine
- Littorine
- Meteloidine
- Scopolamine
