= 6β-Hydroxyhyoscyamine epoxidase =

Class of enzymes

Identifiers
- EC no.: 1.14.11.14
- CAS no.: 121479-53-6

Databases
- IntEnz: IntEnz view
- BRENDA: BRENDA entry
- ExPASy: NiceZyme view
- KEGG: KEGG entry
- MetaCyc: metabolic pathway
- PRIAM: profile
- PDB structures: RCSB PDB PDBe PDBsum
- Gene Ontology: AmiGO / QuickGO
Search
- PMC: articles
- PubMed: articles
- NCBI: proteins

In enzymology, a 6β-hydroxyhyoscyamine epoxidase (EC 1.14.11.14) is an enzyme that catalyzes the chemical reaction

(6S)-6-hydroxyhyoscyamine + 2-oxoglutarate + O_{2} $\rightleftharpoons$ scopolamine + succinate + CO_{2} + H_{2}O

The 3 substrates of this enzyme are (6S)-6-hydroxyhyoscyamine, 2-oxoglutarate, and O_{2}, whereas its 4 products are scopolamine, succinate, CO_{2}, and H_{2}O.

This enzyme belongs to the family of oxidoreductases, specifically those acting on paired donors, with O_{2} as oxidant and incorporation or reduction of oxygen. The oxygen incorporated need not be derived from O_{2} with 2-oxoglutarate as one donor, and incorporation of one atom of oxygen into each donor. This enzyme participates in alkaloid biosynthesis ii. It has two cofactors: iron and ascorbate.

== Nomenclature ==
The systematic name of this enzyme class is (6S)-6-hydroxyhyoscyamine,2-oxoglutarate oxidoreductase (epoxide-forming). This enzyme is also called hydroxyhyoscyamine dioxygenase.
