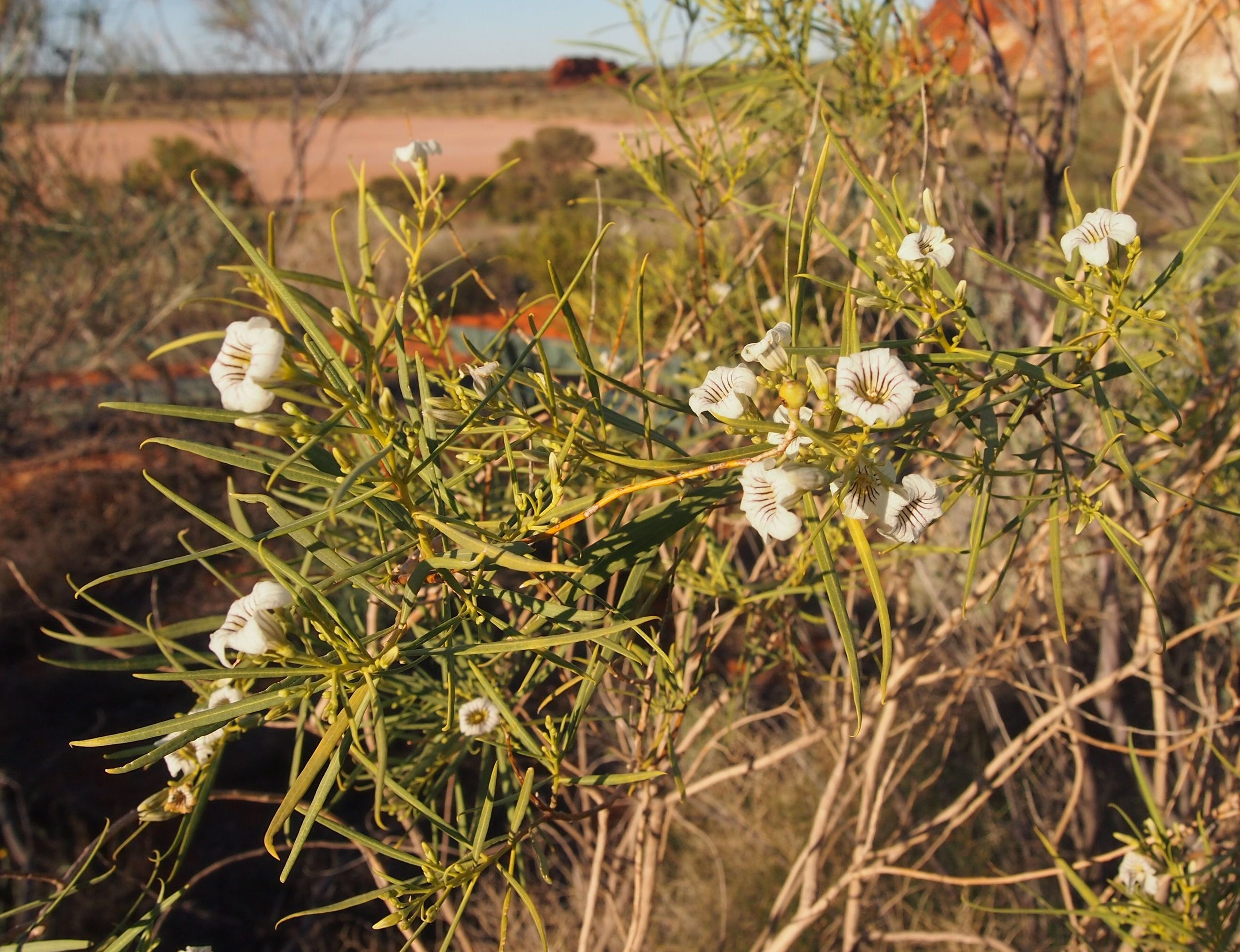

Scientific classification
- Kingdom: Plantae
- Clade: Tracheophytes
- Clade: Angiosperms
- Clade: Eudicots
- Clade: Asterids
- Order: Solanales
- Family: Solanaceae
- Genus: Duboisia
- Species: D. hopwoodii

Binomial name
- Duboisia hopwoodii (F.Muell.) F.Muell.

Synonyms
- Anthocercis hopwoodii F.Muell.

= Duboisia hopwoodii =

Species of plant

Duboisia hopwoodii is a shrub native to the arid interior region of Australia. Common names include pituri, pitchuri thornapple or pitcheri.

== Description ==
The species has an erect habit, usually growing to between 1 and 3 metres in height, with long, narrow leaves. Flowers are white and bell-shaped with violet-striped throats. These appear between June and November in the species' native range followed by purple-black, rounded berries which are 3 to 6 mm in diameter. Like other members of the Solanaceae family such as tobacco, D. hopwoodii contains nicotine.

== Pituri ==
Indigenous Australians mix the dried leaves of a small population of D. hopwoodii growing around the Mulligan River with wood ash to make a variety of pituri, the traditional Aboriginal chewing mixture. D. hopwoodii plants from this region are high in nicotine and low in nornicotine, whereas those found in some other parts of Australia can have very high levels of nornicotine and are sometimes used to contaminate water holes and stun animals to help in hunting. Unlike nicotine, nornicotine forms the carcinogen n-nitrosonornicotine in the human saliva. The paleontologist Dr Gavin Young named the fossil agnathan Pituriaspis doylei after the plant, as he thought he might be hallucinating, as though under the effects of pituri, upon viewing the fossil fish's bizarre form.

== Taxonomy ==
The species was first formally described by botanist Ferdinand von Mueller in 1861 in Fragmenta phytographiae Australiae and given the name Anthocercis hopwoodii. In 1876, von Mueller transferred the species to the genus Duboisia.
