= SMOX =

Enzyme

Identifiers
- Aliases: SMOX, C20orf16, PAO, PAO-1, PAO1, PAOH, PAOH1, SMO, spermine oxidase
- External IDs: OMIM: 615854; MGI: 2445356; GeneCards: SMOX
Enzyme activity
EC #	BRENDA	ExPASy	KEGG	MetaCyc
1.5.3.16	↗	↗	↗	↗

Gene location (Human)
Chr.	Chromosome 20 (human)
Band	20p13	Start	4,120,980 bp
Band	20p13	End	4,187,747 bp

Gene location (Mouse)
Chr.	Chromosome 2 (mouse)
Band	2|2 F1	Start	131,491,496 bp
Band	2|2 F1	End	131,525,922 bp
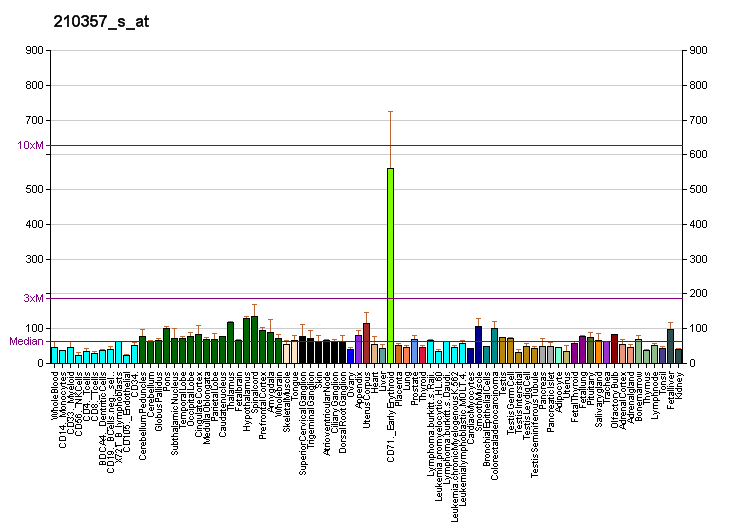

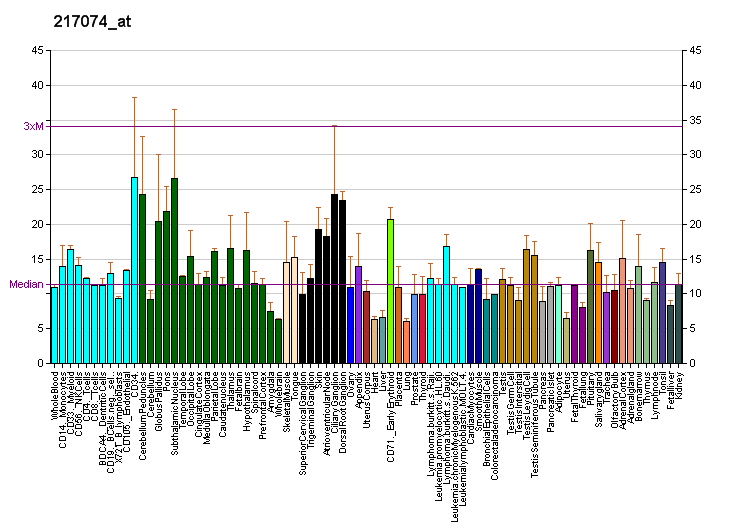
RNA expression pattern
Bgee	Human / Mouse (ortholog); Top expressed in: amygdala; C1 segment; putamen; substantia nigra; hypothalamus; nucleus accumbens; monocyte; cartilage tissue; caudate nucleus; Region I of hippocampus proper / Top expressed in: triceps brachii muscle; sternocleidomastoid muscle; vastus lateralis muscle; knee joint; gastrocnemius muscle; granulocyte; medial head of gastrocnemius muscle; skeletal muscle tissue; fetal liver hematopoietic progenitor cell; molar; More reference expression data
BioGPS	More reference expression data
Gene ontology
Molecular function	N1-acetylspermine:oxygen oxidoreductase (N1-acetylspermidine-forming) activity; polyamine oxidase activity; oxidoreductase activity; norspermine:oxygen oxidoreductase activity; spermine:oxygen oxidoreductase (spermidine-forming) activity
Cellular component	cytosol; nucleus; cytoplasm; nucleoplasm; nuclear membrane; intracellular membrane-bounded organelle
Biological process	polyamine catabolic process; spermine catabolic process; polyamine biosynthetic process
Sources:Amigo / QuickGO
Orthologs
Databases	NCBI: entry; OMA: entry
Species	Human	Mouse
Entrez	54498	228608
Ensembl	ENSG00000088826	ENSMUSG00000027333
UniProt	Q9NWM0	Q99K82
RefSeq (mRNA)	NM_001270691; NM_175839; NM_175840; NM_175841; NM_175842 NM_019025	NM_001177833; NM_001177834; NM_001177835; NM_001177836; NM_001177837 NM_001177838; NM_001177839; NM_001177840; NM_145533
RefSeq (protein)	NP_001257620; NP_787033; NP_787034; NP_787035; NP_787036	NP_001171304; NP_001171305; NP_001171306; NP_001171307; NP_001171308 NP_001171309; NP_001171310; NP_001171311; NP_663508
Location (UCSC)	Chr 20: 4.12 – 4.19 Mb	Chr 2: 131.49 – 131.53 Mb
PubMed search
- Wikidata
View/Edit Human	View/Edit Mouse

Spermine oxidase is an enzyme that in humans is encoded by the SMOX gene.

== Function ==
The product of this gene is the polyamine oxidase. This enzyme potentially represents a new class of catabolic enzymes in the mammalian polyamine metabolic pathway capable of the efficient oxidation of polyamines. More than five transcript variants encoding four active isoenzymes have been identified for this gene, however, not all variants have been fully described. The characterized isoenzymes have distinctive biochemical characteristics and substrate specificities, suggesting the existence of additional levels of complexity in polyamine catabolism.
