= Oxitropium bromide =

Chemical compound

Clinical data
- Trade names: Oxivent, Tersigan, Tersigat, Ventilat
- Other names: N-Ethylscopolammonium bromide; Ba 253; Ba 253BR-L; Ba 253Br; Hyoscine ethobromide; N-Ethylnorscopolamine methyl bromide; Scopolamine ethobromide
- AHFS/Drugs.com: International Drug Names
- ATC code: R03BB02 (WHO)

Identifiers
- IUPAC name: (8r)-6β,7β-Epoxy-8-ethyl-3α-hydroxy-1αH,5αH-tropanium bromide (−)-tropate
- CAS Number: 30286-75-0
- ChemSpider: 16735948
- UNII: SF4NW7NH7C
- ChEMBL: ChEMBL1697846
- CompTox Dashboard (EPA): DTXSID0023402
- ECHA InfoCard: 100.045.543

Chemical and physical data
- Formula: C_{19}H_{26}BrNO_{4}
- Molar mass: 412.324 g·mol^{−1}
- 3D model (JSmol): Interactive image
- SMILES: [Br-].OC[C@H](c1ccccc1)C(=O)O[C@@H]2C[C@@H]3[C@H]4O[C@H]4[C@H](C2)[N+]3(C)CC
- InChI: InChI=1S/C19H26NO4.BrH/c1-3-20(2)15-9-13(10-16(20)18-17(15)24-18)23-19(22)14(11-21)12-7-5-4-6-8-12;/h4-8,13-18,21H,3,9-11H2,1-2H3;1H/q+1;/p-1/t13-,14-,15-,16+,17-,18+,20?;/m1./s1; Key:LCELQERNWLBPSY-KHSTUMNDSA-M

Oxitropium bromide (trade names Oxivent, Tersigan) is an anticholinergic used as a bronchodilator for the treatment of asthma and chronic obstructive pulmonary disease.

It was patented in 1966 and approved for medical use in 1983.

It is a thermosalient material.

== Synthesis ==

Two successive alkylation reactions convert a natural product, norscopolamine (1), into oxitropium bromide. The first, with bromoethane, gives an N-ethyl intermediate (2), which is treated with bromomethane.
