= PAOX =

Protein-coding gene in the species Homo sapiens

Identifiers
- Aliases: PAOX, PAO, polyamine oxidase (exo-N4-amino), polyamine oxidase
- External IDs: OMIM: 615853; MGI: 1916983; GeneCards: PAOX
Enzyme activity
EC #	BRENDA	ExPASy	KEGG	MetaCyc
1.5.3.13	↗	↗	↗	↗

Gene location (Human)
Chr.	Chromosome 10 (human)
Band	10q26.3	Start	133,379,261 bp
Band	10q26.3	End	133,391,694 bp

Gene location (Mouse)
Chr.	Chromosome 7 (mouse)
Band	7|7 F4	Start	139,695,712 bp
Band	7|7 F4	End	139,717,137 bp
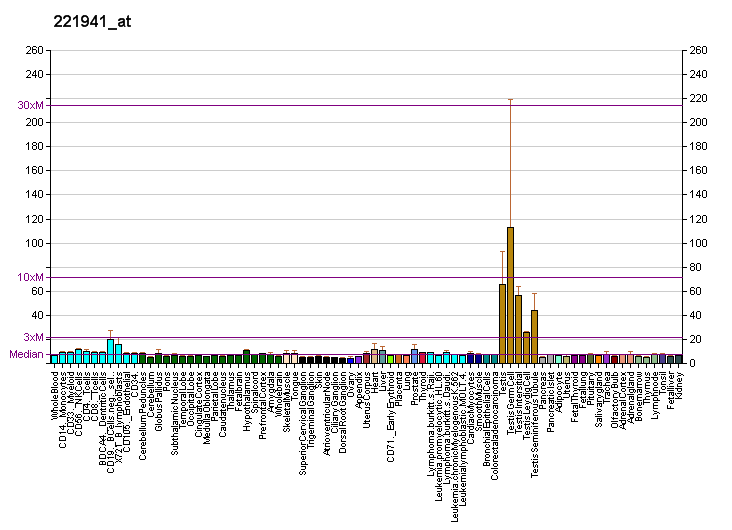

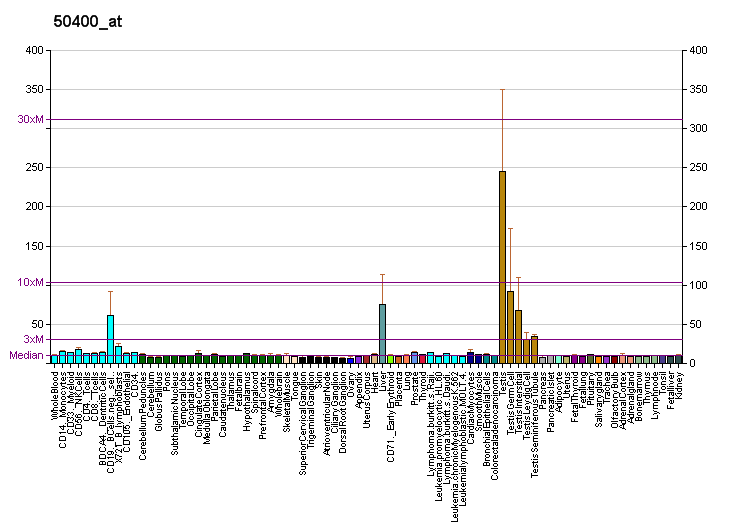
RNA expression pattern
Bgee	Human / Mouse (ortholog); Top expressed in: sperm; left testis; right testis; testicle; gonad; right lobe of liver; mucosa of transverse colon; spleen; granulocyte; sural nerve / Top expressed in: liver; primary oocyte; duodenum; lip; white adipose tissue; epiblast; esophagus; zygote; zone of skin; bone marrow; More reference expression data
BioGPS	More reference expression data
Gene ontology
Molecular function	polyamine oxidase activity; N(1),N(12)-diacetylspermine:oxygen oxidoreductase (3-acetamidopropanal-forming) activity; N1-acetylspermine:oxygen oxidoreductase (3-acetamidopropanal-forming) activity; spermidine:oxygen oxidoreductase (3-aminopropanal-forming) activity; spermine:oxygen oxidoreductase (spermidine-forming) activity; N1-acetylspermidine:oxygen oxidoreductase (3-acetamidopropanal-forming) activity; oxidoreductase activity; signaling receptor binding
Cellular component	cytoplasm; peroxisome; peroxisomal matrix; cytosol
Biological process	spermine metabolic process; spermine catabolic process; spermidine catabolic process; positive regulation of spermidine biosynthetic process; polyamine biosynthetic process; putrescine biosynthetic process; polyamine catabolic process; putrescine catabolic process; protein targeting to peroxisome
Sources:Amigo / QuickGO
Orthologs
Databases	NCBI: entry; OMA: entry
Species	Human	Mouse
Entrez	196743	212503
Ensembl	ENSG00000148832	ENSMUSG00000025464
UniProt	Q6QHF9	Q8C0L6
RefSeq (mRNA)	NM_152911; NM_207125; NM_207126; NM_207127; NM_207128 NM_207129	NM_153783; NM_001346725
RefSeq (protein)	NP_690875; NP_997010; NP_997011	NP_001333654; NP_722478
Location (UCSC)	Chr 10: 133.38 – 133.39 Mb	Chr 7: 139.7 – 139.72 Mb
PubMed search
- Wikidata
View/Edit Human	View/Edit Mouse

Peroxisomal N(1)-acetyl-spermine/spermidine oxidase is an enzyme that in humans is encoded by the PAOX gene.
