= Littorine =

Names
- Systematic IUPAC name (1R,3r,5S)-8-Methyl-8-azabicyclo[3.2.1]octan-3-yl (R)-2-hydroxy-3-phenylpropanoate

Identifiers
| CAS Number | 21956-47-8 |
| 3D model (JSmol) | Interactive image |
| ChemSpider | 391307 |
| PubChem CID | 443005 |
| UNII | 19Q4V37F3R |
| CompTox Dashboard (EPA) | DTXSID20944553 |
- InChI: InChI=1S/C17H23NO3/c1-18-13-7-8-14(18)11-15(10-13)21-17(20)16(19)9-12-5-3-2-4-6-12/h2-6,13-16,19H,7-11H2,1H3/t13-,14+,15+,16-/m1/s1 Key: FNRXUEYLFZLOEZ-FXUDXRNXSA-N
- SMILES: CN1[C@@H]2C[C@@H](OC([C@@H](CC3=CC=CC=C3)O)=O)C[C@H]1CC2

Properties
| Chemical formula | C_{17}H_{23}NO_{3} |
| Molar mass | 289.375 g·mol^{−1} |
- Except where otherwise noted, data are given for materials in their standard state (at 25 °C [77 °F], 100 kPa). Infobox references

Littorine is a tropane alkaloid found in a variety of plants including Datura and Atropa belladonna. It is closely related in chemical structure to scopolamine, atropine, and hyoscyamine, of which the latter two with littorine are isomers and which all share a common biosynthetic pathway.

== See also ==
- Catuabine
- Scopine
