= Arginine 2-monooxygenase =

Class of enzymes

Identifiers
- EC no.: 1.13.12.1
- CAS no.: 9027-36-5

Databases
- BRENDA: enzyme data
- ExPASy: NiceZyme view
- KEGG: enzyme entry
- MetaCyc: metabolic pathway
- Rhea: reactions
- PDB structures: RCSB PDB PDBe PDBsum
- Gene Ontology: AmiGO / QuickGO
Search
- PMC: articles
- PubMed: articles
- NCBI: proteins

Arginine 2-monooxygenase (EC 1.13.12.1) is an enzyme that catalyzes the chemical reaction

arginine
O_{2}
CO_{2} + H_{2}O
tiformin

The two substrates of this enzyme are L-arginine and oxygen. Its products are tiformin (4-guanidinobutanamide), carbon dioxide, and water.

This enzyme belongs to the family of oxidoreductases, specifically those acting on single donors with O_{2} as oxidant and incorporation of two atoms of oxygen into the substrate (oxygenases). The oxygen incorporated need not be derived from O with incorporation of one atom of oxygen (internal monooxygenases o internal mixed-function oxidases). The systematic name of this enzyme class is L-arginine:oxygen 2-oxidoreductase (decarboxylating). Other names in common use include arginine monooxygenase, arginine decarboxylase, arginine oxygenase (decarboxylating), and arginine decarboxy-oxidase. This enzyme participates in urea cycle and metabolism of amino groups. It has one cofactor: flavin adenine dinucleotide.
