= Atropine =

Anticholinergic medication used as antidote for nerve agent poisoning

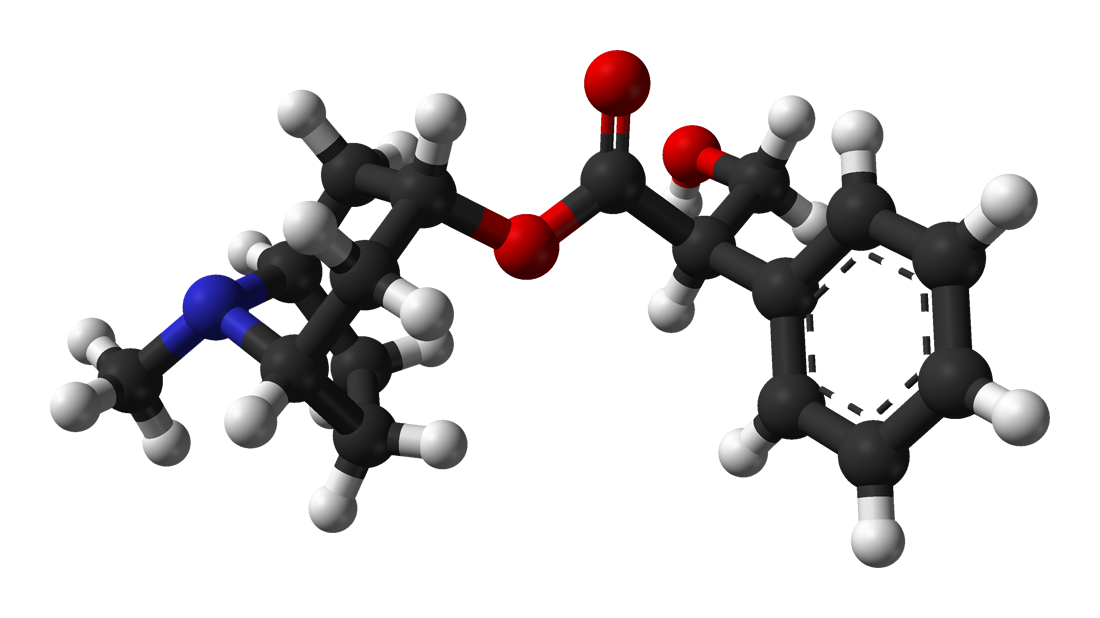

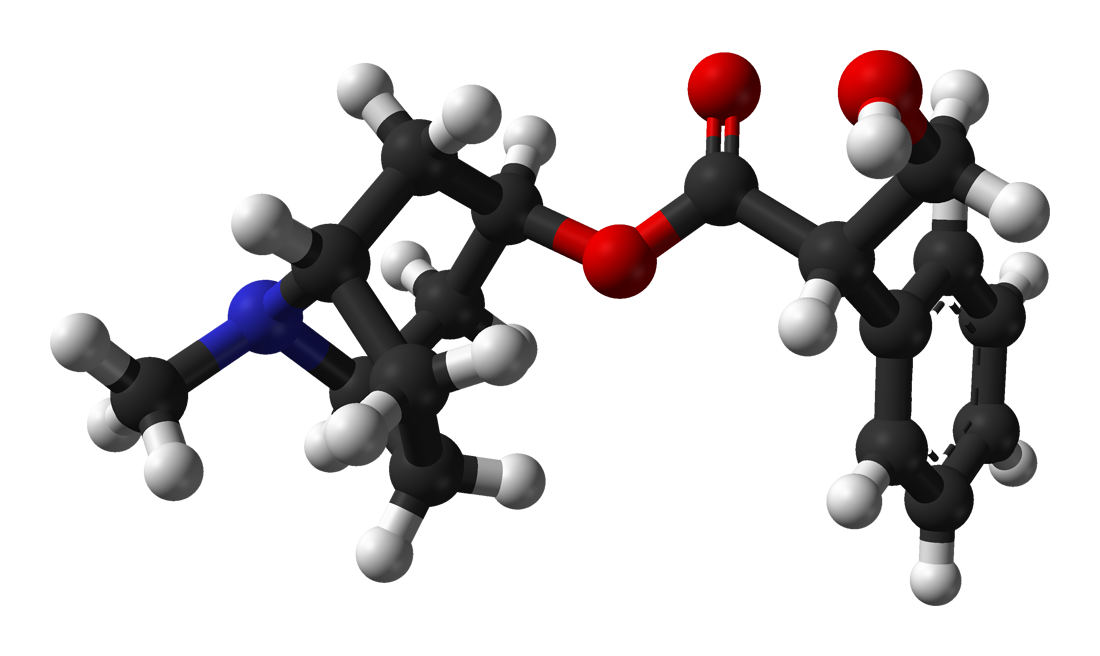
DL-Atropine (top), D-atropine (bottom left), and L-atropine (bottom right) structures

Clinical data
- Trade names: Atropen, others
- Other names: Daturin
- AHFS/Drugs.com: Monograph
- MedlinePlus: a682487
- License data: US DailyMed: Atropine
- Pregnancy category: AU: A
- Routes of administration: By mouth, intravenous, intramuscular, rectal, ophthalmic
- Drug class: antimuscarinic (anticholinergic)
- ATC code: A03BA01 (WHO) S01FA01 (WHO)

Legal status
- Legal status: AU: S4 (Prescription only) / Schedule 2, Appendix G, clause 1; US: ℞-only; EU: Rx-only

Pharmacokinetic data
- Bioavailability: 25%
- Metabolism: ≥50% hydrolysed to tropine and tropic acid
- Onset of action: c. 1 minute
- Elimination half-life: 2 hours
- Duration of action: 30–60 min
- Excretion: 15–50% excreted unchanged in urine

Identifiers
- IUPAC name: (RS)-(8-Methyl-8-azabicyclo[3.2.1]oct-3-yl) 3-hydroxy-2-phenylpropanoate
- CAS Number: 51-55-8
- PubChem CID: 174174
- IUPHAR/BPS: 320
- DrugBank: DB00572
- ChemSpider: 10194105
- UNII: 7C0697DR9I
- KEGG: D00113
- ChEBI: CHEBI:16684
- ChEMBL: ChEMBL517712
- ECHA InfoCard: 100.000.096

Chemical and physical data
- Formula: C_{17}H_{23}NO_{3}
- Molar mass: 289.375 g·mol^{−1}
- 3D model (JSmol): Interactive image
- SMILES: CN3[C@H]1CC[C@@H]3C[C@@H](C1)OC(=O)C(CO)c2ccccc2
- InChI: InChI=1S/C17H23NO3/c1-18-13-7-8-14(18)10-15(9-13)21-17(20)16(11-19)12-5-3-2-4-6-12/h2-6,13-16,19H,7-11H2,1H3/t13-,14+,15+,16?; Key:RKUNBYITZUJHSG-SPUOUPEWSA-N

Atropine is a tropane alkaloid and anticholinergic medication used to treat certain types of nerve agent and pesticide poisonings as well as some types of slow heart rate, and to decrease saliva production during surgery. It is typically given intravenously or by injection into a muscle. Eye drops are also available which are used to treat uveitis and early amblyopia. The intravenous solution usually begins working within a minute and lasts half an hour to an hour. Large doses may be required to treat some poisonings.

Common side effects include dry mouth, abnormally large pupils, urinary retention, constipation, and a fast heart rate. It should generally not be used in people with closed-angle glaucoma. While there is no evidence that its use during pregnancy causes birth defects, this has not been well studied so sound clinical judgment should be used. It is likely safe during breastfeeding. It is an antimuscarinic (a type of anticholinergic) that works by inhibiting the parasympathetic nervous system.

Atropine occurs naturally in a number of plants of the nightshade family, including deadly nightshade (Atropa belladonna), jimsonweed (Datura stramonium), mandrake (Mandragora officinarum) and angel's trumpet (Brugmansia). Atropine was first isolated in 1833. It is on the World Health Organization's List of Essential Medicines. It is available as a generic medication.

== Medical uses ==
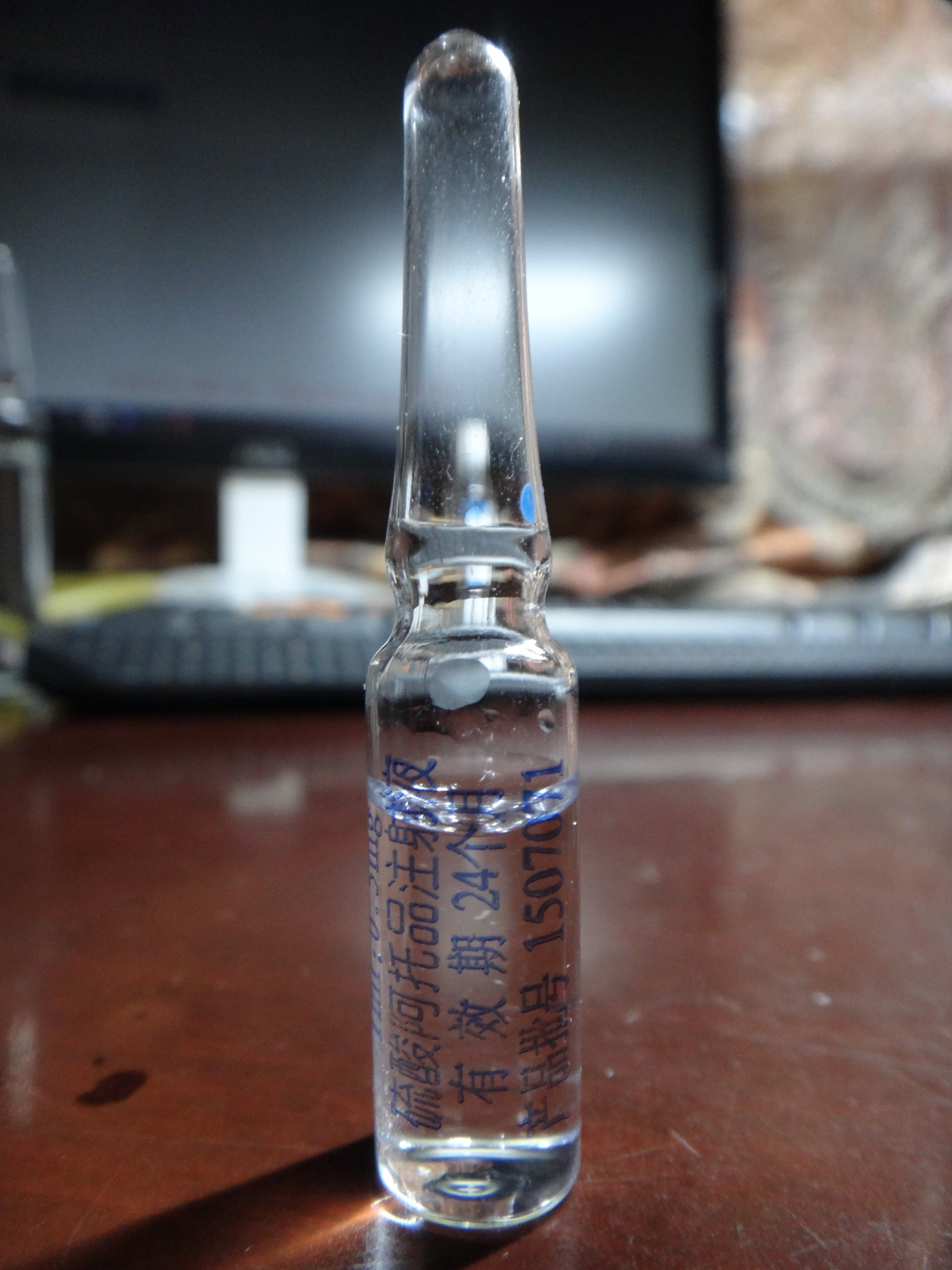
An ampoule containing atropine injection 0.5mg/1mL

=== Eyes ===
Topical atropine is used as a cycloplegic, to temporarily paralyze the accommodation reflex, and as a mydriatic, to dilate the pupils. Atropine degrades slowly, typically wearing off in 7 to 14 days, so it is generally used as a therapeutic mydriatic, whereas tropicamide (a shorter-acting anticholinergic) or phenylephrine (an α-adrenergic agonist) is preferred as an aid to ophthalmic examination.

In refractive and accommodative amblyopia, when occlusion is not appropriate sometimes atropine is given to induce blur in the good eye. Evidence suggests that atropine penalization is just as effective as occlusion in improving visual acuity.

Antimuscarinic topical medication is effective in slowing myopia progression in children; accommodation difficulties and papillae and follicles are possible side effects. All doses of atropine appear similarly effective, while higher doses have greater side effects. The lower dose of 0.01% is thus generally recommended due to fewer side effects and potential less rebound worsening when the atropine is stopped.

=== Heart ===
Injections of atropine are used in the treatment of symptomatic or unstable bradycardia.

Atropine was previously included in international resuscitation guidelines for use in cardiac arrest associated with asystole and PEA but was removed from these guidelines in 2010 due to a lack of evidence for its effectiveness. For symptomatic bradycardia, the usual dosage is 0.5 to 1 mg IV push; this may be repeated every 3 to 5 minutes, up to a total dose of 3 mg (maximum 0.04 mg/kg).

Atropine is also useful in treating second-degree heart block Mobitz type 1 (Wenckebach block), and also third-degree heart block with a high Purkinje or AV-nodal escape rhythm. It is usually not effective in second-degree heart block Mobitz type 2, and in third-degree heart block with a low Purkinje or ventricular escape rhythm.

Atropine has also been used to prevent a low heart rate during intubation of children; however, the evidence does not support this use.

=== Secretions ===
Atropine's actions on the parasympathetic nervous system inhibit salivary and mucous glands. The drug may also inhibit sweating via the sympathetic nervous system. This can be useful in treating hyperhidrosis, and can prevent the death rattle of dying patients. Even though atropine has not been officially indicated for either of these purposes by the FDA, it has been used by physicians for these purposes.

=== Poisonings ===
Atropine acts as an antagonist for organophosphate poisoning by blocking the action of acetylcholine at muscarinic receptors caused by organophosphate insecticides and nerve agents, such as tabun (GA), sarin (GB), soman (GD), and VX. Troops who are likely to be attacked with chemical weapons often carry autoinjectors with atropine and oxime, for rapid injection into the muscles of the thigh. In a developed case of nerve gas poisoning, maximum atropinization is desirable. Atropine is often used in conjunction with the oxime pralidoxime chloride.

Some of the nerve agents attack and destroy acetylcholinesterase by phosphorylation, so the action of acetylcholine becomes excessive and prolonged. Pralidoxime (2-PAM) can be effective against organophosphate poisoning because it can re-cleave this phosphorylation. Atropine can be used to reduce the effect of the poisoning by blocking muscarinic acetylcholine receptors, which would otherwise be overstimulated, by excessive acetylcholine accumulation.

Atropine or diphenhydramine can be used to treat muscarine intoxication.

Atropine was added to cafeteria salt shakers in an attempt to poison the staff of Radio Free Europe during the Cold War.

=== Irinotecan-induced diarrhea ===
Atropine has been observed to prevent or treat irinotecan induced acute diarrhea.

== Contraindications ==
It is generally contraindicated in people with glaucoma, pyloric stenosis, or prostatic hypertrophy, except in doses ordinarily used for preanesthesia.

== Side effects ==
Adverse reactions to atropine include ventricular fibrillation, supraventricular or ventricular tachycardia, dizziness, nausea, blurred vision, loss of balance, dilated pupils, photophobia, dry mouth and potentially extreme confusion, deliriant hallucinations, and excitation especially among the elderly. These latter effects are because atropine can cross the blood–brain barrier. Because of the hallucinogenic properties, some have used the drug recreationally, though this is potentially dangerous and often unpleasant.

In overdoses, atropine is poisonous. Atropine is sometimes added to potentially addictive drugs, particularly antidiarrhea opioid drugs such as diphenoxylate or difenoxin, wherein the secretion-reducing effects of the atropine can also aid the antidiarrhea effects.

Although atropine treats bradycardia (slow heart rate) in emergency settings, it can cause paradoxical heart rate slowing when given at very low doses (less than 0.5 mg), presumably as a result of central action in the CNS. One proposed mechanism for atropine's paradoxical bradycardia effect at low doses involves blockade of inhibitory presynaptic muscarinic autoreceptors, thereby blocking a system that inhibits the parasympathetic response.

Atropine is incapacitating at doses of 10 to 20 mg per person. Its LD_{50} is estimated to be 453 mg per person (by mouth) with a probit slope of 1.8. The antidote to atropine is physostigmine or pilocarpine.

A common mnemonic used to describe the physiologic manifestations of atropine overdose is: "hot as a hare, blind as a bat, dry as a bone, red as a beet, and mad as a hatter". These associations reflect the specific changes of warm, dry skin from decreased sweating, blurry vision, decreased lacrimation, vasodilation, and central nervous system effects on muscarinic receptors, type 4 and 5. This set of symptoms is known as anticholinergic toxidrome, and may also be caused by other drugs with anticholinergic effects, such as hyoscine hydrobromide (scopolamine), diphenhydramine, phenothiazine antipsychotics and benztropine.

== Pharmacology ==
In general, atropine counters the "rest and digest" activity of glands regulated by the parasympathetic nervous system, producing clinical effects such as increased heart rate and delayed gastric emptying. This occurs because atropine is a competitive, reversible antagonist of the muscarinic acetylcholine receptors (acetylcholine being the main neurotransmitter used by the parasympathetic nervous system).

Atropine is a competitive antagonist of the muscarinic acetylcholine receptor types M1, M2, M3, M4 and M5. It is classified as an anticholinergic drug (parasympatholytic).

In cardiac uses, it works as a nonselective muscarinic acetylcholinergic antagonist, increasing firing of the sinoatrial node (SA) and conduction through the atrioventricular node (AV) of the heart, opposes the actions of the vagus nerve, blocks acetylcholine receptor sites, and decreases bronchial secretions.

In the eye, atropine induces mydriasis by blocking the contraction of the circular pupillary sphincter muscle, which is normally stimulated by acetylcholine release, thereby allowing the radial iris dilator muscle to contract and dilate the pupil. Atropine induces cycloplegia by paralyzing the ciliary muscles, whose action inhibits accommodation to allow accurate refraction in children, helps to relieve pain associated with iridocyclitis, and treats ciliary block (malignant) glaucoma.

The vagus (parasympathetic) nerves that innervate the heart release acetylcholine (ACh) as their primary neurotransmitter. ACh binds to muscarinic receptors (M2) that are found principally on cells comprising the sinoatrial (SA) and atrioventricular (AV) nodes. Muscarinic receptors are coupled to the G_{i} subunit; therefore, vagal activation decreases cAMP. Gi-protein activation also leads to the activation of KACh channels that increase potassium efflux and hyperpolarizes the cells.

Increases in vagal activities to the SA node decrease the firing rate of the pacemaker cells by decreasing the slope of the pacemaker potential (phase 4 of the action potential); this decreases heart rate (negative chronotropy). The change in phase 4 slope results from alterations in potassium and calcium currents, as well as the slow-inward sodium current that is thought to be responsible for the pacemaker current (If). By hyperpolarizing the cells, vagal activation increases the cell's threshold for firing, which contributes to the reduction in the firing rate. Similar electrophysiological effects also occur at the AV node; however, in this tissue, these changes are manifested as a reduction in impulse conduction velocity through the AV node (negative dromotropy). In the resting state, there is a large degree of vagal tone in the heart, which is responsible for low resting heart rates.

There is also some vagal innervation of the atrial muscle, and to a much lesser extent, the ventricular muscle. Vagus activation, therefore, results in modest reductions in atrial contractility (inotropy) and even smaller decreases in ventricular contractility.

Muscarinic receptor antagonists bind to muscarinic receptors thereby preventing ACh from binding to and activating the receptor. By blocking the actions of ACh, muscarinic receptor antagonists very effectively block the effects of vagal nerve activity on the heart. By doing so, they increase heart rate and conduction velocity.

== Chemistry ==
Atropine, a tropane alkaloid, is an enantiomeric mixture of d-hyoscyamine and l-hyoscyamine, with most of its physiological effects due to l-hyoscyamine, the 3(S)-endo isomer of atropine. Its pharmacological effects are due to binding to muscarinic acetylcholine receptors. It is an antimuscarinic agent. Significant levels are achieved in the CNS within 30 minutes to 1 hour and disappear rapidly from the blood with a half-life of 2 hours. About 60% is excreted unchanged in the urine, and most of the rest appears in the urine as hydrolysis and conjugation products. Noratropine (24%), atropine-N-oxide (15%), tropine (2%), and tropic acid (3%) appear to be the major metabolites, while 50% of the administered dose is excreted as apparently unchanged atropine. No conjugates were detectable. Evidence that atropine is present as (+)-hyoscyamine was found, suggesting that stereoselective metabolism of atropine probably occurs. Effects on the iris and ciliary muscle may persist for longer than 72 hours.

The most common atropine compound used in medicine is atropine sulfate (monohydrate) (C_{17}H_{23}NO_{3})_{2}·H_{2}SO_{4}·H_{2}O, the full chemical name is 1αH,5αH-tropan-3-α-ol (±)-tropate(ester), sulfate monohydrate.

=== Synthesis ===
Atropine can be synthesized by the reaction of tropine with tropic acid in the presence of hydrochloric acid.

== Natural sources ==
Atropine is found in many members of the family Solanaceae. The most commonly found sources are Atropa belladonna (the deadly nightshade), Datura innoxia, D. wrightii, D. metel, and D. stramonium. Other sources include members of the genera Brugmansia (angel's trumpets) and Hyoscyamus.

=== Biosynthesis ===
The biosynthesis of atropine starting from l-phenylalanine first undergoes a transamination forming phenylpyruvic acid which is then reduced to phenyl-lactic acid. Coenzyme A then couples phenyl-lactic acid with tropine forming littorine, which then undergoes a radical rearrangement initiated with a P450 enzyme forming hyoscyamine aldehyde. A dehydrogenase then reduces the aldehyde to a primary alcohol making (−)-hyoscyamine, which upon racemization forms atropine.

== History ==
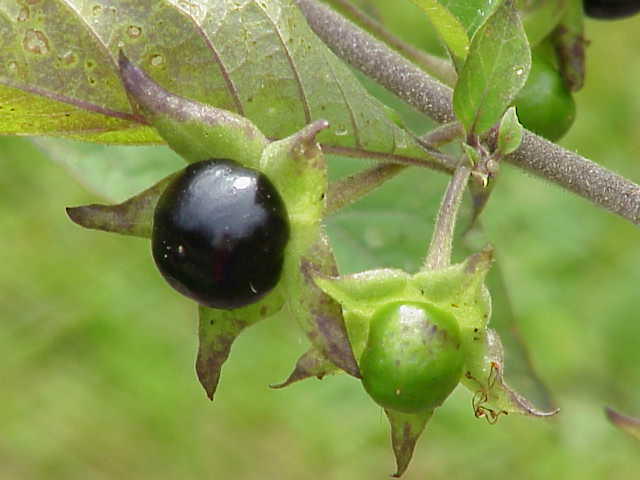
Atropa belladonna

The name atropine was coined in the 19th century, when pure extracts from the belladonna plant Atropa belladonna were first made. The medicinal use of preparations from plants in the nightshade family is much older however. Mandragora (mandrake) was described by Theophrastus in the fourth century BC for the treatment of wounds, gout, and sleeplessness, and as a love potion. By the first century AD Dioscorides recognized wine of mandrake as an anaesthetic for treatment of pain or sleeplessness, to be given before surgery or cautery. The use of nightshade preparations for anesthesia, often in combination with opium, persisted throughout the Roman and Islamic Empires and continued in Europe until superseded in the 19th century by modern anesthetics.

Atropine-rich extracts from the Egyptian henbane plant (another nightshade) were used by Cleopatra in the last century B.C. to dilate the pupils of her eyes, in the hope that she would appear more alluring. Likewise, it is widely claimed that in the Renaissance, women used the juice of the berries of the nightshade Atropa belladonna to enlarge their pupils for cosmetic reasons. However, primary records of this practice are not known, and the claim may have originated much later by conflating records of actual cosmetic use (for complexion) with the mydriastic properties of atropine. A source from the late 19th century claims that the practice was also current in Paris.

The pharmacological study of belladonna extracts was begun by the German chemist Friedlieb Ferdinand Runge (1795–1867). In 1831, the German pharmacist Heinrich F. G. Mein (1799-1864) succeeded in preparing a pure crystalline form of the active substance, which was named atropine. The substance was first synthesized by German chemist Richard Willstätter in 1901.

== Society and culture ==
The species name "belladonna" ('beautiful woman' in Italian) comes from the original use of deadly nightshade to dilate the pupils of the eyes for cosmetic effect. Both atropine and the genus name for deadly nightshade derive from Atropos, one of the three Fates who, according to Greek mythology, chose how a person was to die.

=== Legal status ===
In March 2025, the Committee for Medicinal Products for Human Use (CHMP) of the European Medicines Agency adopted a positive opinion, recommending the granting of a marketing authorization for the medicinal product Ryjunea, intended for slowing the progression of myopia in children aged 3 to 14 years. The applicant for this medicinal product is Santen Oy. Ryjunea was authorized for medical use in the European Union in June 2025.

In March 2025, the CHMP recommended the refusal of a pediatric use marketing authorization for Atropine sulfate FGK, a medicine intended for the treatment of myopia (short-sightedness) in children aged 6 to 10 years of age. In June 2025, FGK Representative Service requested a re-examination by the CHMP.
