= Lysine 2-monooxygenase =

Class of enzymes

Identifiers
- EC no.: 1.13.12.2
- CAS no.: 9031-22-5

Databases
- BRENDA: enzyme data
- ExPASy: NiceZyme view
- KEGG: enzyme entry
- MetaCyc: metabolic pathway
- Rhea: reactions
- PDB structures: RCSB PDB PDBe PDBsum
- Gene Ontology: AmiGO / QuickGO
Search
- PMC: articles
- PubMed: articles
- NCBI: proteins

Lysine 2-monooxygenase (EC 1.13.12.2) is an enzyme that catalyzes the chemical reaction

L-lysine
O_{2}
CO_{2} + H_{2}O
5-aminopentanamide

The two substrates of this enzyme are L-lysine and oxygen. Its products are 5-aminopentanamide, carbon dioxide, and water.

This enzyme belongs to the family of oxidoreductases, specifically those acting on single donors with O_{2} as oxidant and incorporation of two atoms of oxygen into the substrate (oxygenases). The oxygen incorporated need not be derived from O with incorporation of one atom of oxygen (internal monooxygenases o internal mixed-function oxidases). The systematic name of this enzyme class is L-lysine:oxygen 2-oxidoreductase (decarboxylating). Other names in common use include lysine oxygenase, lysine monooxygenase, and L-lysine-2-monooxygenase. This enzyme participates in lysine degradation. It employs one cofactor, flavin adenine dinucleotide.
