= Tropinone reductase I =

tropine dehydrogenase

Identifiers
- EC no.: 1.1.1.206
- CAS no.: 118390-87-7

Databases
- IntEnz: IntEnz view
- BRENDA: BRENDA entry
- ExPASy: NiceZyme view
- KEGG: KEGG entry
- MetaCyc: metabolic pathway
- PRIAM: profile
- PDB structures: RCSB PDB PDBe PDBsum
- Gene Ontology: AmiGO / QuickGO
Search
- PMC: articles
- PubMed: articles
- NCBI: proteins

In enzymology, a tropinone reductase I (EC 1.1.1.206) is an enzyme that catalyzes the chemical reaction

tropine + NADP^{+} $\rightleftharpoons$ tropinone + NADPH + H^{+}

Thus, the two substrates of this enzyme are tropine and NADP^{+}, whereas its 3 products are tropinone, NADPH, and H^{+}.

This enzyme belongs to the family of oxidoreductases, specifically those acting on the CH-OH group of donor with NAD^{+} or NADP^{+} as acceptor. The systematic name of this enzyme class is tropine:NADP^{+} 3alpha-oxidoreductase. Other names in common use include tropine dehydrogenase, tropinone reductase (ambiguous), and TR-I. This enzyme participates in alkaloid biosynthesis ii.
