= Hyoscyamine =

Tropane alkaloid

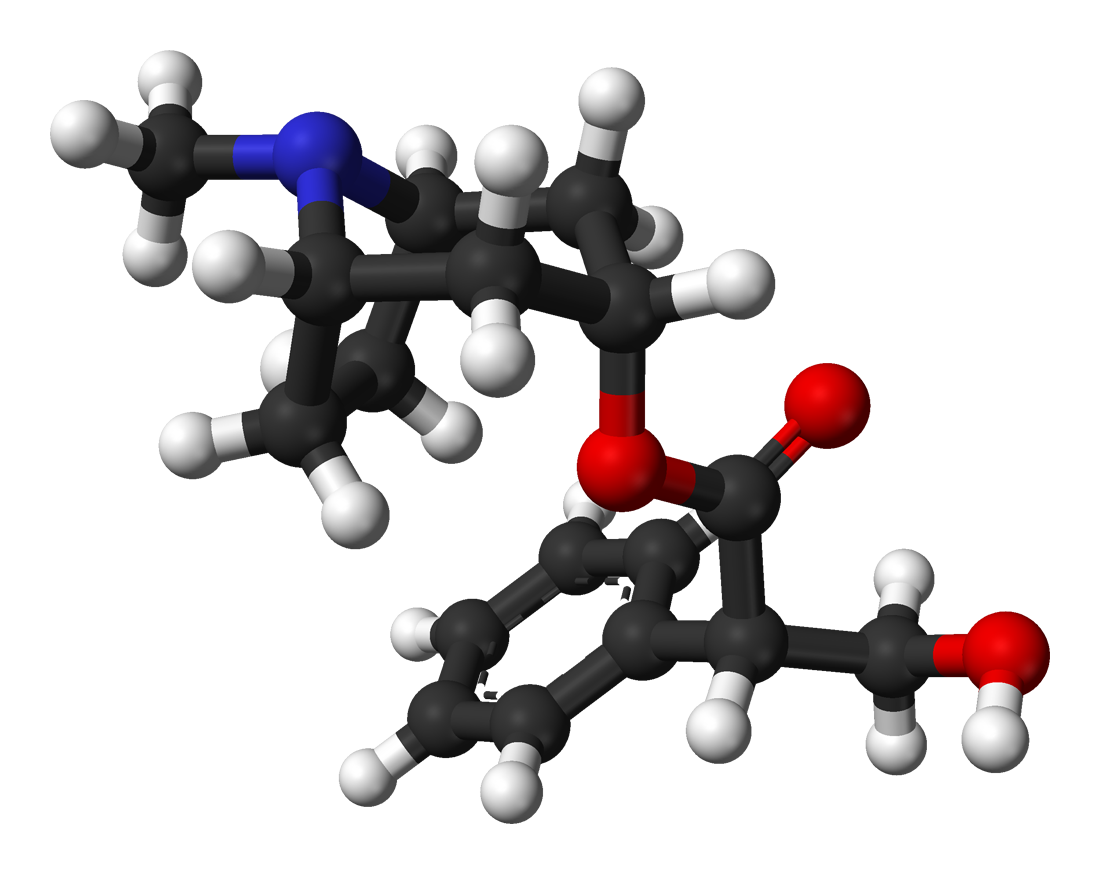

Clinical data
- Trade names: Anaspaz, Levbid, Levsin, others
- Other names: Daturine, duboisine
- AHFS/Drugs.com: Monograph
- MedlinePlus: a684010
- Routes of administration: By mouth, sublingual, subcutaneous, intramuscular, intravenous
- Drug class: Antimuscarinic, antiemetic
- ATC code: A03BA03 (WHO)

Legal status
- Legal status: AU: S4 (Prescription only); US: ℞-only

Pharmacokinetic data
- Bioavailability: 50% protein binding
- Metabolism: Liver
- Elimination half-life: 3–5 hours
- Excretion: Kidney

Identifiers
- IUPAC name: (S)-(1R,3r,5S)-8-methyl-8-azabicyclo[3.2.1]octan-3-yl 3-hydroxy-2-phenylpropanoate
- CAS Number: 101-31-5
- PubChem CID: 154417
- DrugBank: DB00424
- ChemSpider: 10246417
- UNII: PX44XO846X
- KEGG: D00147
- ChEBI: CHEBI:17486
- ChEMBL: ChEMBL1697729
- CompTox Dashboard (EPA): DTXSID80889335
- ECHA InfoCard: 100.002.667

Chemical and physical data
- Formula: C_{17}H_{23}NO_{3}
- Molar mass: 289.375 g·mol^{−1}
- 3D model (JSmol): Interactive image
- SMILES: CN3[C@H]1CC[C@@H]3C[C@@H](C1)OC(=O)[C@H](CO)c2ccccc2
- InChI: InChI=1S/C17H23NO3/c1-18-13-7-8-14(18)10-15(9-13)21-17(20)16(11-19)12-5-3-2-4-6-12/h2-6,13-16,19H,7-11H2,1H3/t13-,14+,15+,16-/m1/s1; Key:RKUNBYITZUJHSG-FXUDXRNXSA-N

Hyoscyamine (also known as daturine or duboisine) is a naturally occurring tropane alkaloid and plant toxin. It is a secondary metabolite found in certain plants of the family Solanaceae, including henbane, mandrake, angel's trumpets, jimsonweed, the sorcerers' tree, and deadly nightshade. It is the levorotatory isomer of atropine.

In 2021, it was the 272nd most commonly prescribed medication in the United States, with more than 900,000 prescriptions.

== Medical uses ==
Hyoscyamine is used to provide symptomatic relief of spasms caused by various lower abdominal and bladder disorders including peptic ulcers, irritable bowel syndrome, diverticulitis, pancreatitis, colic, and interstitial cystitis. It has also been used to relieve some heart problems, control some of the symptoms of Parkinson's disease, as well as for control of abnormal respiratory symptoms and "hyper-mucus secretions" in patients with lung disease.

It is also useful in pain control for neuropathic pain, chronic pain, and palliative care for those with intractable pain from treatment-resistant, untreatable, and incurable diseases. The closely related drugs atropine and hyoscine and other members of the anticholinergic drug group like cyclobenzaprine, trihexyphenidyl, and orphenadrine are also used for this purpose. When hyoscyamine is used along with opioids or other anti-peristaltic agents, measures to prevent constipation are especially important given the risk of paralytic ileus.

== Adverse effects ==
Side effects include dry mouth, blurred vision, dizziness, and palpitations. An overdose will cause headache, nausea, vomiting, and central nervous system symptoms including disorientation, hallucinations, euphoria, sexual arousal, short-term memory loss, and possible coma in extreme cases. The euphoric and sexual effects are stronger than those of atropine but weaker than those of hyoscine, as well as dicycloverine, orphenadrine, cyclobenzaprine, trihexyphenidyl, and ethanolamine antihistamines like phenyltoloxamine.

== Pharmacology ==
=== Pharmacodynamics ===
Hyoscyamine is an antimuscarinic; i.e., an antagonist of muscarinic acetylcholine receptors. It blocks the action of acetylcholine at sweat glands (sympathetic) and at parasympathetic sites in salivary glands, stomach secretions, heart muscle, sinoatrial node, smooth muscle in the gastrointestinal tract, and the central nervous system. It increases cardiac output and heart rate, lowers blood pressure and dries secretions. It may antagonize serotonin. At comparable doses, hyoscyamine has 98 percent of the anticholinergic power of atropine; the other major Atropa belladonna-derived drug hyoscine (known in the United States as scopolamine) has 92 per cent of the antimuscarinic potency of atropine.

Hyoscyamine has been described as a selective muscarinic acetylcholine M_{2} receptor antagonist without significant effects at the other muscarinic acetylcholine receptors. This is in contrast to related antimuscarinics like atropine and scopolamine, which are non-selective antagonists of all five muscarinic acetylcholine receptors. Antagonism of both the muscarinic acetylcholine M_{1} receptor and M_{2} receptor has been implicated as having negative effects on memory and cognition. Hyoscyamine has been described as having deliriant effects similarly to scopolamine, atropine, and other antimuscarinics. However, other sources have reported that hyoscyamine potently antagonizes all five muscarinic acetylcholine receptor subtypes.

== Biosynthesis in plants ==
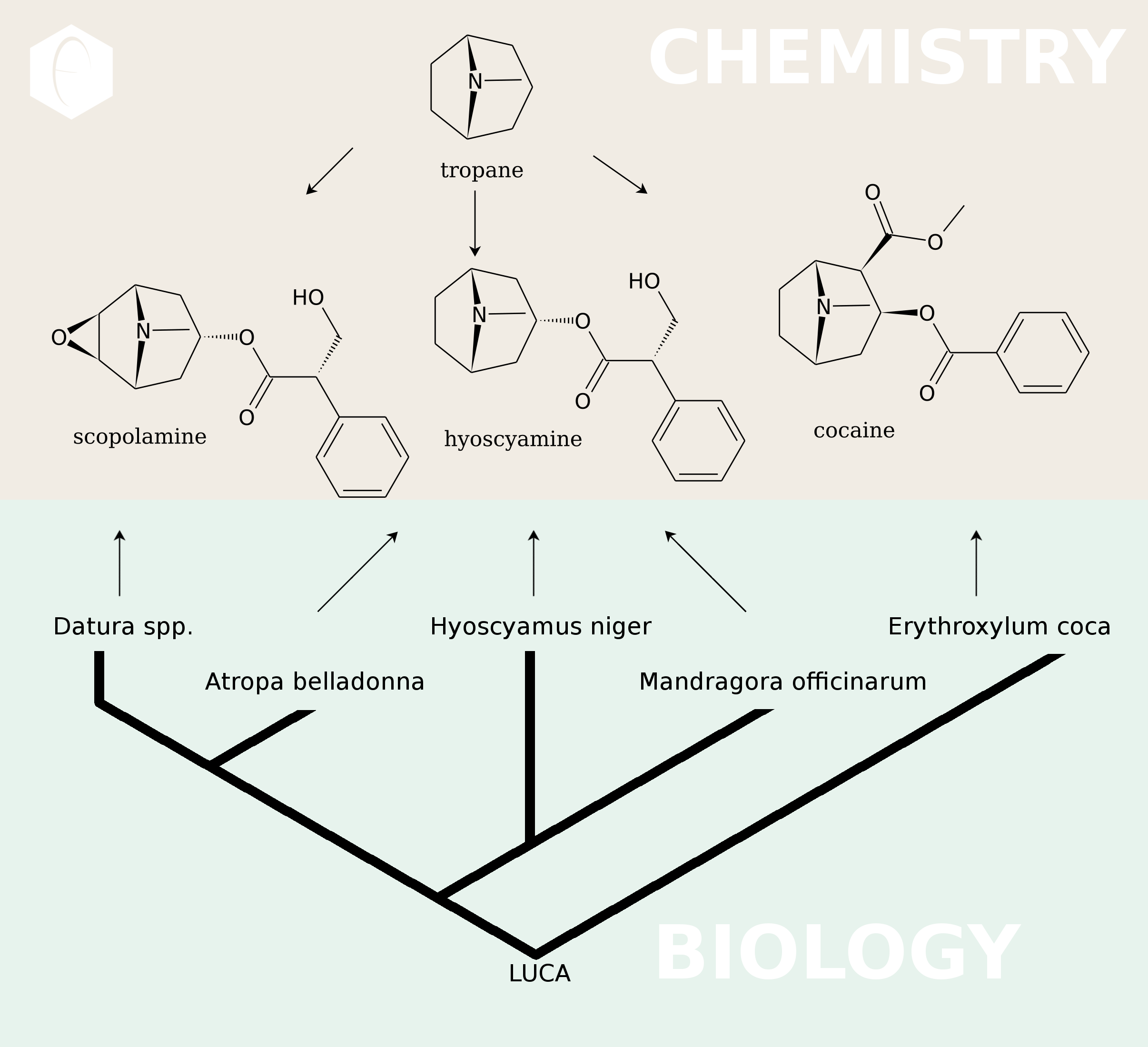
Biochemistry of tropane class compounds. Hyoscyamine and scopolamine are present and labeled in the diagram.

Hyoscyamine can be extracted from plants of the family Solanaceae, notably Datura stramonium. As hyoscyamine is a direct precursor in the plant biosynthesis of hyoscine, it is produced via the same metabolic pathway.

A generic presentation of the steps in the biosynthesis of hyoscine, adapted from the review of Ziegler and Facchini, is illustrated below. It begins with the decarboxylation of L-ornithine to putrescine by ornithine decarboxylase (EC 4.1.1.17). Putrescine is methylated to N-methylputrescine by putrescine N-methyltransferase (EC 2.1.1.53).

A putrescine oxidase (EC 1.4.3.10) that specifically recognizes methylated putrescine catalyzes the deamination of this compound to 4-methylaminobutanal which then undergoes a spontaneous ring formation to N-methylpyrrolium cation. In the next step, the pyrrolium cation condenses with acetoacetic acid yielding hygrine. No enzymatic activity could be demonstrated that catalyzes this reaction. Hygrine further rearranges to tropinone.

Subsequently, tropinone reductase I (EC 1.1.1.206) converts tropinone to tropine which condenses with phenylalanine-derived phenyllactate to littorine. A cytochrome P450 classified as Cyp80F1 oxidizes and rearranges littorine to hyoscyamine aldehyde.

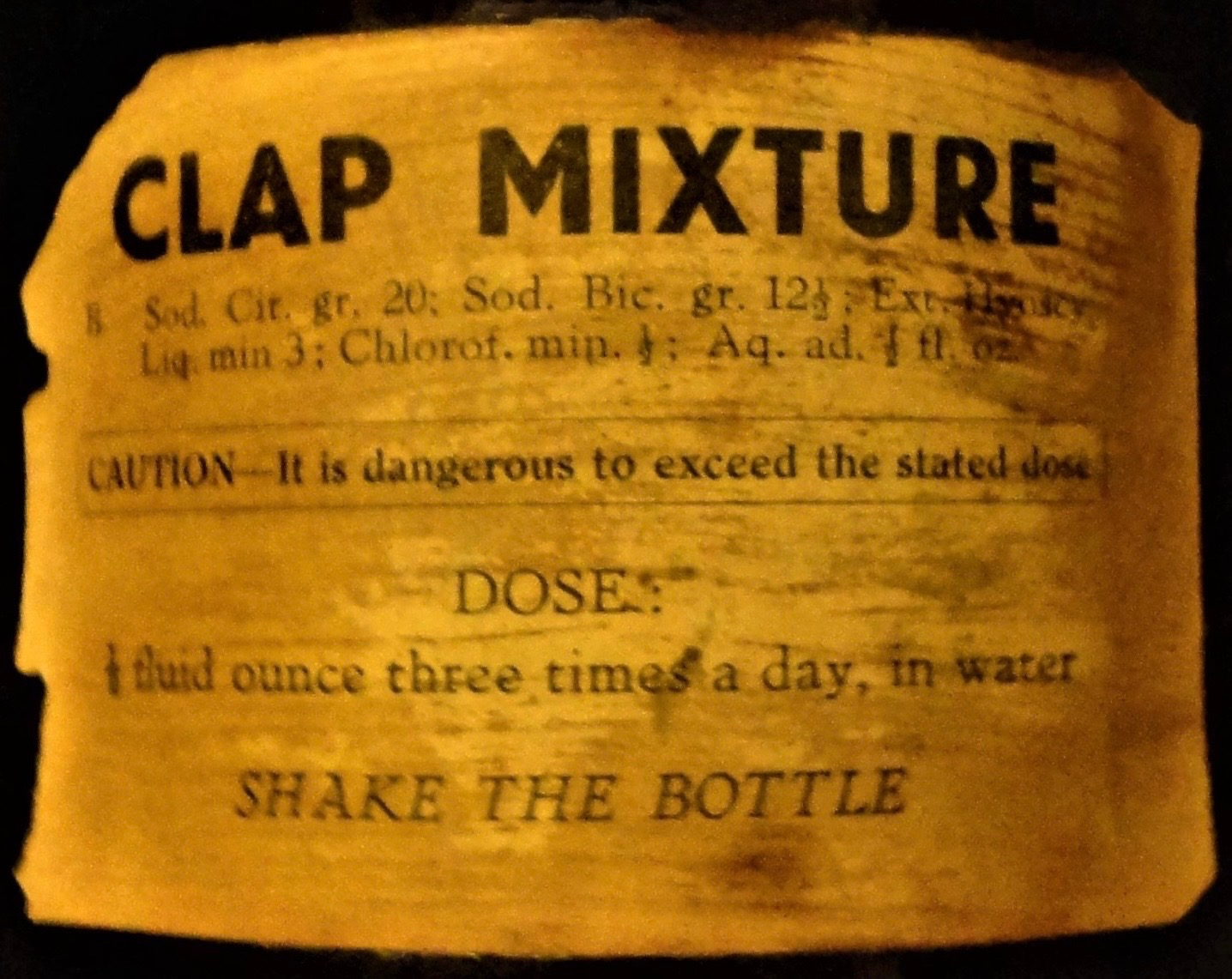
Ingredients of a "Clap Mixture" (medical formulation), putatively hyoscyamine-containing, Clap being a colloquial synonym for "the sexually transmitted infection, gonorrhea".

== Society and culture ==
German-Australian botanist Baron Sir Ferdinand Jacob Heinrich von Mueller, on finding that Aboriginal communities had used a soft corkwood tree (Duboisia myoporoides) extract as a medicine, including for seasickness, led an effort to export the natural product isolate from Australia, and to create a "mystery pill" that was used by the Allies in World War II, specifically, to prevent seasickness among soldiers ferried across the English Channel during the Invasion of Normandy. Later, it was found that components of the same natural product isolate, hyoscyamine and scopolamine, could be used in pharmaceutical production—which, by virtue of use in eye surgery, led to the growth of a multi-million dollar industry in Queensland.

A separate historic, apparent, but unsubstantiated off-label use of hysoscyamine was in the treatment of sexually transmitted infections.

=== Brand names ===
Brand names for hyoscyamine include Symax, HyoMax, Anaspaz, Egazil, Buwecon, Cystospaz, Levsin, Levbid, Levsinex, Donnamar, NuLev, Spacol T/S, and Neoquess.

=== Ethnopharmacology ===
A plant extract used "for catching fish, in ceremony to connect with the spiritual realm", and as a bush medicine, "in a sleeping potion and for a variety of other uses", was developed by Aboriginal peoples from the soft corkwood tree, Duboisia myoporoides, found "in South Eastern NSW [New South Wales] across to Northern Queensland, Australia"; modern studies have shown the Aboriginal medicine to contain the alkaloids hyoscyamine and scopolamine.
