= Putrescine oxidase =

Enzyme

putrescine oxidase

Identifiers
- EC no.: 1.4.3.10
- CAS no.: 9076-87-3

Databases
- BRENDA: enzyme data
- ExPASy: NiceZyme view
- KEGG: enzyme entry
- MetaCyc: metabolic pathway
- Rhea: reactions
- PDB structures: RCSB PDB PDBe PDBsum
- Gene Ontology: AmiGO / QuickGO
Search
- PMC: articles
- PubMed: articles
- NCBI: proteins

In enzymology, putrescine oxidase (EC 1.4.3.10) is an enzyme that catalyzes the chemical reaction

Putrescine
+ H_{2}O
O_{2}
H_{2}O_{2}
O_{2}
H_{2}O_{2}
4-Aminobutanal
+ NH_{3}

The 3 substrates of this enzyme are putrescine, water, and oxygen. Its products are 4-aminobutanal, hydrogen peroxide, and ammonia.

This enzyme belongs to the family of oxidoreductases, specifically those acting on the CH-NH_{2} group of donors with oxygen as acceptor. The systematic name of this enzyme class is putrescine:oxygen oxidoreductase (deaminating). This enzyme participates in urea cycle and metabolism of amino groups. It employs one cofactor, FAD.
