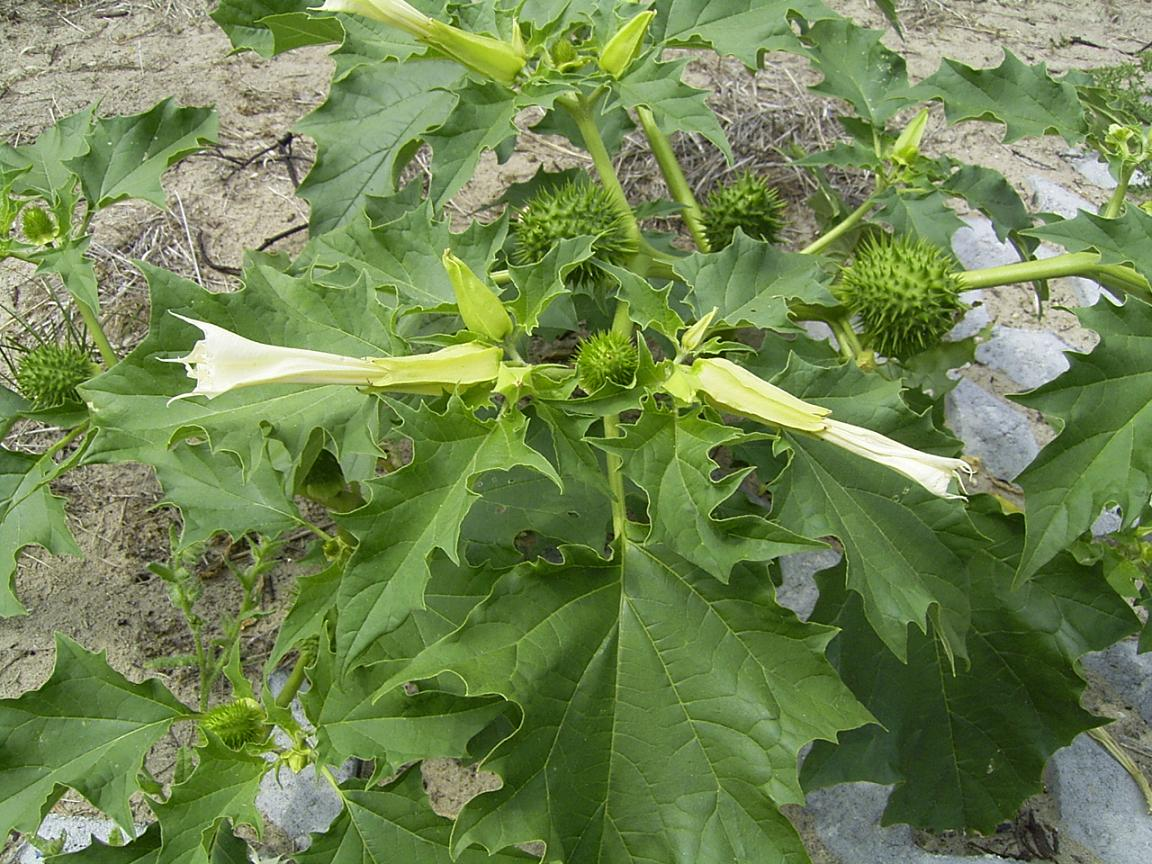
- Datura stramonium

Scientific classification
- Kingdom: Plantae
- Clade: Tracheophytes
- Clade: Angiosperms
- Clade: Eudicots
- Clade: Asterids
- Order: Solanales
- Family: Solanaceae
- Subfamily: Solanoideae
- Tribe: Datureae

Type genus
- Datura

Genera
- Brugmansia Pers.; Datura L.; Daturodendron; Trompettia

= Datureae =

Tribe of flowering plants

Daturae is a tribe of flowering plants in the subfamily Solanoideae of the family Solanaceae. It comprises three genera: Datura, the Devil's trumpets, Brugmansia, the Angel's trumpets, and the monotypic Trompettia.

These plants are all genetically related. Phylogenetic research shows that Datura species evolved out of an ancestor shared with Nicotiana Tabacum. Whether or not Datura and Brugmansia species evolved out of each other is disputed.

== Genera ==
Image	Genus	Species
	Brugmansia Pers.	Brugmansia arborea (L.) Sweet (Andes - Ecuador to northern Chile); Brugmansia aurea Lagerh. (Andes - Venezuela to Ecuador); Brugmansia insignis (Barb.Rodr.) Lockwood ex R.E. R.E.Schult. (Eastern Andes foothills - Colombia to Bolivia and occasionally Brazil); Brugmansia sanguinea (Ruiz & Pav.) D.Don (Andes - Colombia to northern Chile); Brugmansia suaveolens (Willd.) Sweet (Southeast Brazil); Brugmansia versicolor Lagerh. (Ecuador); Brugmansia vulcanicola (A.S.Barclay) R.E.Schult. (Andes - Colombia to Ecuador)
	Datura L.	D. ceratocaula Jacq. – torna loco; D. discolor Bernh. – desert thorn-apple; D. ferox L. – long-spined thorn-apple; D. innoxia Mill. – thorn-apple, downy thorn-apple, Indian-apple, moonflower, sacred datura, toloatzin, toloache; D. leichhardtii F.Muell. ex Benth. (syn. D. pruinosa) – Leichhardt's datura; D. metel L. – devil's trumpet; D. quercifolia Kunth – oak-leaf thorn-apple; D. stramonium L. (syn. D. inermis) – jimsonweed, thorn-apple; D. wrightii Regel – sacred datura, sacred thorn-apple
	Daturodendron	Daturodendron absconditum (Andes - Colombia to Peru)
	Trompettia J.Dupin	Trompettia cardenasiana(Hunz.) J.Dupin
