= Aposcopolamine =

Names
- Other names Apohyoscine

Identifiers
CAS Number	535-26-2
3D model (JSmol)	Interactive image
ChemSpider	10393207
PubChem CID	4486617
UNII	RQ98RV32RG
- InChI: InChI=1S/C17H19NO3/c1-10(11-6-4-3-5-7-11)17(19)20-12-8-13-15-16(21-15)14(9-12)18(13)2/h3-7,12-16H,1,8-9H2,2H3/t12-,13-,14+,15-,16+ Key: JJNVDCBKBUSUII-JGPUMOJJSA-N; InChI=1/C17H19NO3/c1-10(11-6-4-3-5-7-11)17(19)20-12-8-13-15-16(21-15)14(9-12)18(13)2/h3-7,12-16H,1,8-9H2,2H3/t12-,13-,14+,15-,16+ Key: JJNVDCBKBUSUII-JGPUMOJJBD
- SMILES: O=C(O[C@@H]1C[C@H]2N(C)[C@@H](C1)[C@@H]3O[C@H]23)C(\c4ccccc4)=C

Properties
Chemical formula	C_{17}H_{19}NO_{3}
Molar mass	285.343 g·mol^{−1}
- Except where otherwise noted, data are given for materials in their standard state (at 25 °C [77 °F], 100 kPa). Infobox references

Aposcopolamine (apohyoscine) is a tropane alkaloid found in Datura ferox and several species of Physochlaina. These plants belong to the nightshade family, Solanaceae, in which tropane alkaloids commonly occur, particularly in tribes Datureae and Hyoscyameae.

== See also ==
- Atropine
- Scopolamine
