= Datura lanosa =

Scientific classification
- Kingdom: Plantae
- Clade: Tracheophytes
- Clade: Angiosperms
- Clade: Eudicots
- Clade: Asterids
- Order: Solanales
- Family: Solanaceae
- Genus: Datura
- Species: D. lanosa

Binomial name
- Datura lanosa Bye

Species of plant

Datura lanosa is a species of Datura. Some contemporary botanists classify this plant not as a separate species, but as a variety of Datura wrightii or Datura innoxia.

This Datura is a small shrub, producing trumpet shaped flowers. The fruit is small, with thorns carrying many seeds.

== Cultivation ==
Datura lanosa is grown in yards or gardens as an ornamental plant and is native to Mexico.
