= Chinese thorn-apple =

Chinese thorn-apple is a common name for several flowering plants in the family Solanaceae and may refer to:

- Datura ferox
- Datura quercifolia, native to Mexico and the southwestern United States
