= C16H21NO3 =

The molecular formula C_{16}H_{21}NO_{3} (molar mass: 275.35 g/mol, exact mass: 275.1521 u) may refer to:

- Datumetine
- Homatropine
- Methylenedioxypyrovalerone (MDPV)
- Rolipram
