= Datura reburra =

Scientific classification
- Kingdom: Plantae
- Clade: Tracheophytes
- Clade: Angiosperms
- Clade: Eudicots
- Clade: Asterids
- Order: Solanales
- Family: Solanaceae
- Genus: Datura
- Species: D. reburra

Binomial name
- Datura reburra A.S.Barclay

Species of plant

Datura reburra is a species of Datura. It is an annual shrub that is grown as an ornamental plant.

Contemporary experts classify this plant not as a separate species, but as a variety of Datura discolor.
