= Sally Stewart-Wade =

Australian plant pathologist

Dr. Sally Michelle Stewart-Wade is an Australian plant pathologist currently working as a Casual Professional at the Royal Melbourne Institute of Technology (RMIT) in Sydney, Australia. Wade was born in 1969 in Sydney and completed her education at RMIT where she received a Bachelor of Applied Science in Applied Biology. She went on to complete her PhD at RMIT studying the "biological control of the weed thornapple." She has studied many aspects of weed control, as well as, fungal diseases on plants. Stewart-Wade has also reviewed the scientific literature twice for the nursery and garden industry on plant pathogens in recycled irrigation water, and the efficacy of organic soil amendments such as compost.

== Early life ==
Stewart-Wade grew up in Melbourne, Australia, where her parents settled down after living in Canada for two years. She is the youngest of four children, two older brothers, and an older sister. She grew up attending private school and claims that her parents were "very encouraging, offering to help us with our homework and so on." She considers her primary school education the main reason she became interested in science, citing the fact that she very curious as a child and wanted to know how things worked. Her parents did not direct them toward science but were more encouraging in a broad sense of having all of their children pursue education. In 1987 Wade enrolled at the RMIT.

== University education ==
After enrolling at RMIT in 1987, Wade completed her degree program three years later and earned a Bachelor of Applied Science in Applied Biology in 1990. After realizing that it was going to be difficult to find an occupation with her three-year degree, Wade stayed at RMIT for an Honours year and did a research project on fungal disease of grevilleas. In 1992, Wade was awarded the Australian Postgraduate Research Award which allowed her to pursue a PhD at RMIT. It was during her PhD studies that Wade began research on the weed thornapple, which is one of her best-known works.
