= Datura kymatocarpa =

Scientific classification
- Kingdom: Plantae
- Clade: Tracheophytes
- Clade: Angiosperms
- Clade: Eudicots
- Clade: Asterids
- Order: Solanales
- Family: Solanaceae
- Genus: Datura
- Species: D. kymatocarpa

Binomial name
- Datura kymatocarpa Barclay

Variety of Datura discolor, a species of plant

Datura kymatocarpa is a species of Datura. It is native to Mexico and is an annual plant.

Contemporary experts classify this plant not as a separate species, but as a variety of Datura discolor.
