= Datumetine =

Chemical compound

Identifiers
- IUPAC name: 4-Methoxy-3-(8-methyl-8-azabicyclo[3.2.1]octan-3-yl)benzoic acid
- CAS Number: 67078-20-0
- PubChem CID: 181868
- ChemSpider: 158188
- CompTox Dashboard (EPA): DTXSID40986112

Chemical and physical data
- Formula: C_{16}H_{21}NO_{3}
- Molar mass: 275.348 g·mol^{−1}
- 3D model (JSmol): Interactive image
- SMILES: O=C(O)C1=CC=C(OC)C(=C1)C2CC3N(C)C(CC3)C2
- InChI: InChI=1S/C16H21NO3/c1-17-12-4-5-13(17)8-11(7-12)14-9-10(16(18)19)3-6-15(14)20-2/h3,6,9,11-13H,4-5,7-8H2,1-2H3,(H,18,19); Key:CMMJWJKGQZIJPB-UHFFFAOYSA-N

Datumetine is a tropane alkaloid found in leaves of Datura metel. It is said to modulate NMDA receptor and thus causes memory loss. It also causes epileptic seizures in mice. Docking studies suggest that it fits on both allosteric and orthosteric sites of NMDA receptor. It acts together with other anticholinergic tropane alkaloids of datura to cause amnesia.

== See also ==
- Datura ferox
