= Trompettia =

Scientific classification
- Kingdom: Plantae
- Clade: Tracheophytes
- Clade: Angiosperms
- Clade: Eudicots
- Clade: Asterids
- Order: Solanales
- Family: Solanaceae
- Subfamily: Solanoideae
- Tribe: Datureae
- Genus: Trompettia; J.Dupin
- Species: T. cardenasiana

Binomial name
- Trompettia cardenasiana (Hunz.) J.Dupin

Synonyms
- Iochroma cardenasianum Hunz.

Genus of shrubs

Trompettia cardenasiana is a species of nightshade that is a spiny shrub bearing very small leaves, 0.35–0.5 cm (0.1–0.2 in) by 0.1–0.12 cm (0.04–0.05 in), a yellow trumpet-shaped campanulate flower, measuring about 3 cm (1.2 in) long and globose fruit. The growth habit is somewhat reminiscent of certain Lycium species. It is endemic to Bolivia, growing in dry, Andean valleys at elevations of 2,000–2,500 m (6,600–8,200 ft) and 3,000–3,500 m (9,800–11,500 ft) and has been collected near the town of Cotagaita in Potosí Department.

== Description ==
Woody shrubs to 2 m tall. Stems erect but arching towards apices, many of these becoming spiny, older portions glabrous, becoming pubescent towards younger portions of stem, trichomes simple, < 0.25 mm, the internodes 4–35 mm long. Spines 3–8 cm, 0.2-0.3 mm in diameter at base. Leaves borne in clusters on very short shoots (these < 1 mm long), subtended by dense protrusions of trichomes, on short petioles to 5 mm long, these pubescent with short eglandular trichomes or glabrous, the blades simple, alternate, narrowly obelliptic to narrowly elliptic, 20-50 × 3–10 mm, (2-)4.7 to 7.5 times longer than wide, the bases attenuate, the apices broadly acute to obtuse, the margins entire, both surfaces covered by glandular trichomes (these seeming to result in black spots on pressed specimens) with occasional sparse simple trichomes along midrib of abaxial surface. Flowers solitary in leaf axils, on pedicels to 6 mm long, pubescent with eglandular trichomes, pendant. Calyces 9–12 mm long at anthesis, the tubes 5-6 × 4–5 mm, light green, the lobes subulate, 5–6 mm long, pubescent adaxially, slightly accrescent during fruit maturation and eventually splitting along longitudinal axis to expose mature fruit. Corollas infundibuliform (these more tubular just before anthesis), 30–35 mm long including lobes and 12–17 mm wide at the mouth, yellow (paler at base, becoming more vibrant towards apex), the lobes 2-4 × 7–10 mm, primary lobe veins extending into acuminate tip, external surfaces pubescent with uniformly distributed short, eglandular trichomes. Stamens 5, the filaments 22–25 mm, adnate to the basal 5–8 mm of the corolla tube, free portions 17–19 mm, included within corolla, pubescent only along the adnate portion. Anthers 3–4 × 2–2.5 mm, basifixed, dehiscence latrorse, glabrous. Ovary superior, bilocular, surrounded by dark red nectary at base, glabrous, the styles 27–29 mm, included within the corolla. Fruit a berry, round, 5–10 mm wide, immature fruit green turning dark brown in pressed specimens. Seeds tetrahedral, 3–4 mm, brown to dark brown, ca. 10–20 per fruit, embryo coiled.

Trompettia cardenasiana is similar to Brugmansia species in bearing both pendant flowers and fleshy, indehiscent fruits. It is, however, readily distinguishable by its much smaller flowers, small, narrowly elliptic leaves, small, round fruits, and tetrahedral seeds.

== Taxonomy ==
The species was originally described in Iochroma but subsequent research revealed that, far from being a species of Iochroma, it did not even belong in tribe Physaleae (to which Iochroma belongs), constituting instead a monotypic genus in tribe Datureae most closely related to the genera Datura and Brugmansia. The genus Trompettia was eventually created to accommodate the species.

=== Etymology ===
The generic name Trompettia is derived from the French 'trompette', diminutive of 'trompe' (horn) and alludes to the shape of the flowers, which resemble small trumpets. The specific name cardenasiana commemorates eminent Bolivian scientist Martín Cárdenas (1899–1973).
