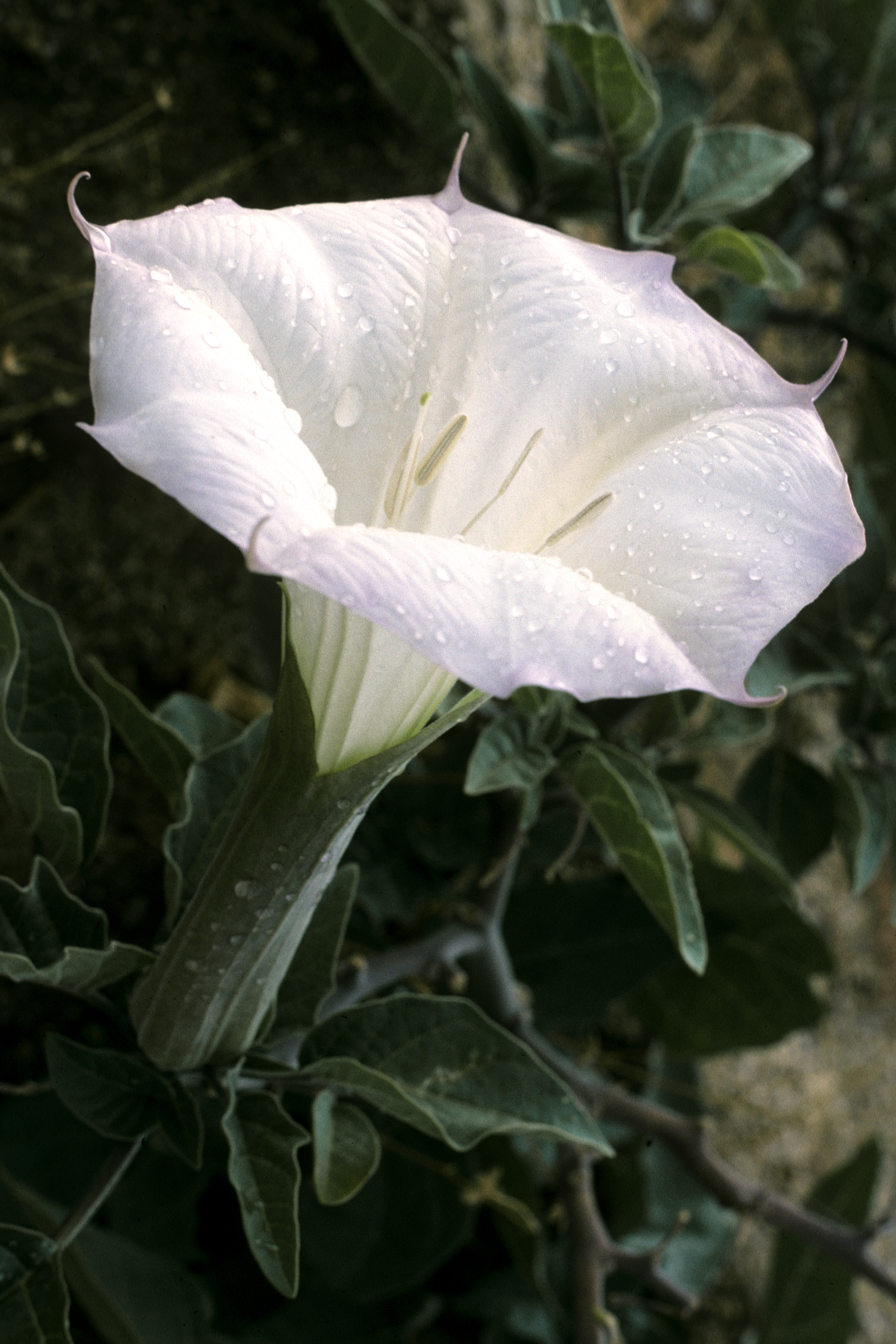
- Datura wrightii

Scientific classification
- Kingdom: Plantae
- Clade: Tracheophytes
- Clade: Angiosperms
- Clade: Eudicots
- Clade: Asterids
- Order: Solanales
- Family: Solanaceae
- Subfamily: Solanoideae
- Tribe: Datureae
- Genus: Datura; L.

Type species
- Datura stramonium L.

Species
- 9–14 (See text)

= Datura =

Genus of poisonous, potentially psychoactive plants

Datura is a genus of nine species of highly poisonous, vespertine-flowering plants belonging to the nightshade family (Solanaceae). They are commonly known as thornapples or jimsonweeds, but are also known as devil's trumpets or mad apple (not to be confused with angel's trumpets, which are placed in the closely related genus Brugmansia). Other English common names include moonflower, devil's weed and hell's bells. All species of Datura are extremely poisonous and psychoactive, especially their seeds and flowers, which can cause respiratory depression, arrhythmias, fever, delirium, hallucinations, anticholinergic toxidrome, psychosis, and death if taken internally.

The name Datura originates from the Sanskrit word for "thorn-apple," with historical and cultural significance in Ayurveda and Hinduism, while the American term "jimsonweed" derives from its prevalence in Jamestown, Virginia, where it was called "Jamestown-Weed." Datura species are herbaceous annual or short-lived perennial plants up to two meters tall with trumpet-shaped flowers and spiny fruit capsules, historically used in traditional medicine, especially in India, where they hold cultural and ritual significance. Datura species classification is complex due to high variability and overlapping traits among species, with many "new species" later reclassified as local varieties or subspecies; most species are native to Mexico, though some have disputed native ranges outside the Americas. Datura is closely related to Brugmansia and the recently established Trompettia.

Due to their effects and symptoms, Datura species have occasionally been used not only as poisons, but also as hallucinogens by various groups throughout history. Traditionally, their psychoactive administration has often been associated with witchcraft and sorcery or similar practices in many cultures, including the Western world. Certain common Datura species have also been used ritualistically as entheogens by some Native American groups.

Non-psychoactive use of plants in the genus is usually done for medicinal purposes, and the alkaloids present in some species have long been considered traditional medicines in both the New and Old Worlds due to the presence of the alkaloids scopolamine and atropine, which are also produced by plants associated with Old World medicine such as Hyoscyamus niger, Atropa belladonna and Mandragora officinarum.

== Etymology ==
The generic name Datura is taken from Hindi धतूरा dhatūra "thorn-apple", ultimately from Sanskrit धत्तूर dhattūra "white thorn-apple" (referring to Datura metel of Asia). In the Ayurvedic text Sushruta Samhita, different species of Datura are also referred to as kanaka and unmatta. Dhatura is offered to Lord Shiva in Hinduism. Record of this name in English dates back to 1662. Nathaniel Hawthorne refers to one type in The Scarlet Letter as "apple-Peru". In Mexico, its common name is toloache (also spelled tolguacha), which derives from the Nahuatl tolohuaxihuitl, meaning "the plant with the nodding head" (in reference to the nodding seed capsules of Datura species belonging to section Dutra of the genus).

The term "Jimsonweed" is said to come from the American colony Jamestown. In Jamestown datura was common, and was referred to as "Jamestown-Weed" by one Virginian, Robert Beverley Jr. This then turned into the term "Jimsonweed".

== Description ==
Datura species are herbaceous, leafy annuals and short-lived perennials, which can reach up to 2 m (6 ft 7 in) in height. The leaves are alternate, 10–20 cm (3.9–7.9 in) long, and 5–18 cm (2.0–7.1 in) broad, with a lobed or toothed margin. The flowers are erect or spreading (not pendulous like those of Brugmansia), trumpet-shaped, 5–20 cm (2.0–7.9 in) long, and 4–12 cm (1.6–4.7 in) broad at the mouth; colours vary from white to yellow and pale purple. The fruit is a spiny capsule, 4–10 cm (1.6–3.9 in) long and 2–6 cm (0.8–2 in) broad, splitting open when ripe to release the numerous seeds. The seeds disperse freely over pastures, fields and even wasteland locations.

Datura belongs to the classic "witches' weeds", along with deadly nightshade, henbane and mandrake. All parts of the plants are toxic, and the genus has a long history of use for causing delirious states and death. It was well known as an essential ingredient of magical ointments, potions and witches' brews, most notably Datura stramonium.

In India, D. metel has long been regarded as a poison and aphrodisiac, having been used in Ayurveda as a medicine since ancient times. It features in rituals and prayers to Shiva and also in Ganesh Chaturthi, a festival devoted to the deity Ganesha. The larvae of some Lepidoptera (butterfly and moth) species, including Hypercompe indecisa, eat some Datura species. It has been observed that while insects may prefer to feed on Datura leaves, other animals such as cows will generally avoid consuming them.

== Species and cultivars ==
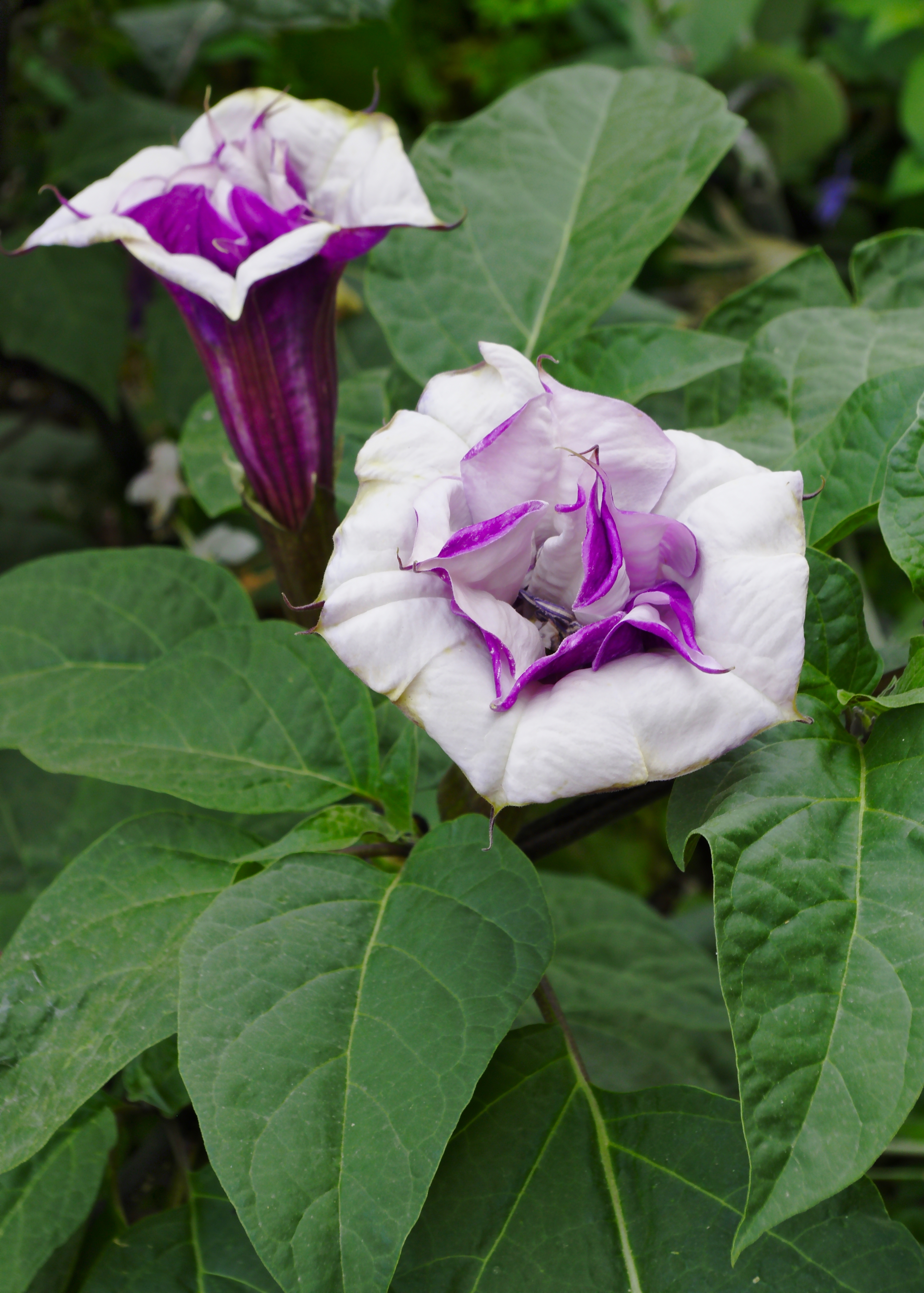
Datura metel 'Fastuosa'

Classifying Datura as to its species is difficult, and the descriptions of new species often are accepted prematurely. Later, these "new species" are found to be simply varieties that have evolved due to conditions at a specific location. These new designations usually disappear in a few years. Contributing to the confusion is the fact that various species, such as D. wrightii and D. innoxia, are very similar in appearance, and the variation within a species can be extreme. For example, Datura species can change size of plant, leaf and flowers, all depending on location. The same species, when growing in a half-shady, damp location, can develop into a flowering bush 80 cm (30 in) in height, but when growing in a very dry location, will only grow into a thin plant not much more 13 cm (5 in), with tiny flowers and a few miniature leaves. Datura species are native to dry, temperate and subtropical regions. Most species are native to Mexico, which is considered the centre of origin of the genus. Several species are considered to have extra-American native ranges: D. ferox (native to China), D. metel (native to India and Southeast Asia) and D. leichardthii (native to Australia); however, these may be early introductions from Central America.

A group of South American species formerly placed in the genus Datura are now placed in the distinct genus Brugmansia (Brugmansia differs from Datura in that it is woody (the species being shrubs or small trees) and has indehiscent fruits.) The solanaceous tribe Datureae, to which Datura and Brugmansia belong, has recently acquired a new, monotypic genus Trompettia J. Dupin, featuring the species Trompettia cardenasiana, which had hitherto been misclassified as belonging to the genus Iochroma.

Datura specialists Ulrike Preissel and Hans-Georg Preissel accept only nine species of Datura, but Kew's Plants of the World Online lists the following 14 (out of which its related The Plant List does not include D. arenicola, D. lanosa and D. pruinosa as accepted spp.):

- Datura arenicola Gentry ex Bye & Luna
- Datura ceratocaula Ortega
- Datura discolor Bernh.
- Datura ferox L.
- Datura innoxia Mill.
- Datura kymatocarpa Barclay
- Datura lanosa A.S.Barclay ex Bye
- Datura leichhardtii Benth.
- Datura metel L.
- Datura pruinosa Greenm.
- Datura quercifolia Kunth
- Datura reburra Barclay
- Datura stramonium L.
- Datura wrightii Regel

Of the above, D. leichhardtii is close enough to D. pruinosa to merit demotion to a subspecies and likewise D. ferox and D. quercifolia are close enough in morphology to merit being subsumed in a single species. Furthermore, the Australian provenance of D. leichhardtii, the Chinese provenance of D. ferox, and the Afro-Asiatic provenance of D. metel have been cast into serious doubt, with the three species being almost certainly post-Columbian introductions to the regions to which they were originally thought native.

The case of D. metel is unique in that not only is the plant not a true species at all, but an assemblage of ancient pre-Columbian cultivars created from D. innoxia in the Greater Antilles, but evidence is mounting that it was introduced to the Indian subcontinent no later than the second century CE—whether by natural or human agency is, as yet, unknown—making it one of the most ancient plant introductions (if not the most ancient) from the New World to the Old World (see Columbian Exchange).

D. arenicola is a recently discovered species, described first in 2013, of very restricted range, and so distinctive as to have merited the creation for it of the new section Discola [not to be confused with the species name D. discolor] within the genus. The specific name arenicola means "loving (i.e. "thriving in") sand".

Image	Scientific name	Common name	Distribution
	Datura arenicola Gentry ex Bye & Luna	Sand thorn-apple, Baja datura, Vizcaíno Desert datura	Baja California Sur, Mexico
	D. ceratocaula Jacq.	torna loco, Sister of Ololiuhqui, swamp datura	Mexico
	D. discolor Bernh. (syn. D. kymatocarpa, D. reburra)	desert thorn-apple	Sonoran Desert of western North America
	D. ferox L.	long-spined thorn-apple	southeastern China (disputed)
	D. innoxia Mill.	thorn-apple, downy thorn-apple, Indian-apple, moonflower, toloatzin, toloache	Southwestern United States, Central and South America (cosmopolitan weed)
	D. leichhardtii F.Muell. ex Benth. (syn. D. pruinosa)	Leichhardt's datura	from Mexico to Guatemala
	D. metel L.	Hindu datura, Indian thorn-apple, devil's trumpet	Asia, Africa (disputed)
	D. quercifolia Kunth	oak-leaved thorn-apple	Mexico and the Southwestern United States
	D. stramonium L. (syn. D. inermis, D. bernhardii)	jimsonweed, thorn-apple, devil's snare	Central America (cosmopolitan weed)
	D. wrightii Regel	sacred datura, western jimsonweed, California jimsonweed, Momoy, sacred thorn-apple, tolguacha, toloache	Southwestern United States

American Brugmansia and Datura Society, Inc. (ABADS) is designated in the 2004 edition of the International Code of Nomenclature for Cultivated Plants as the official International Cultivar Registration Authority for Datura. This role was delegated to ABADS by the International Society for Horticultural Science in 2002.

=== Past classified species ===
- D. lanosa
- D. suaveolens

== Cultivation ==
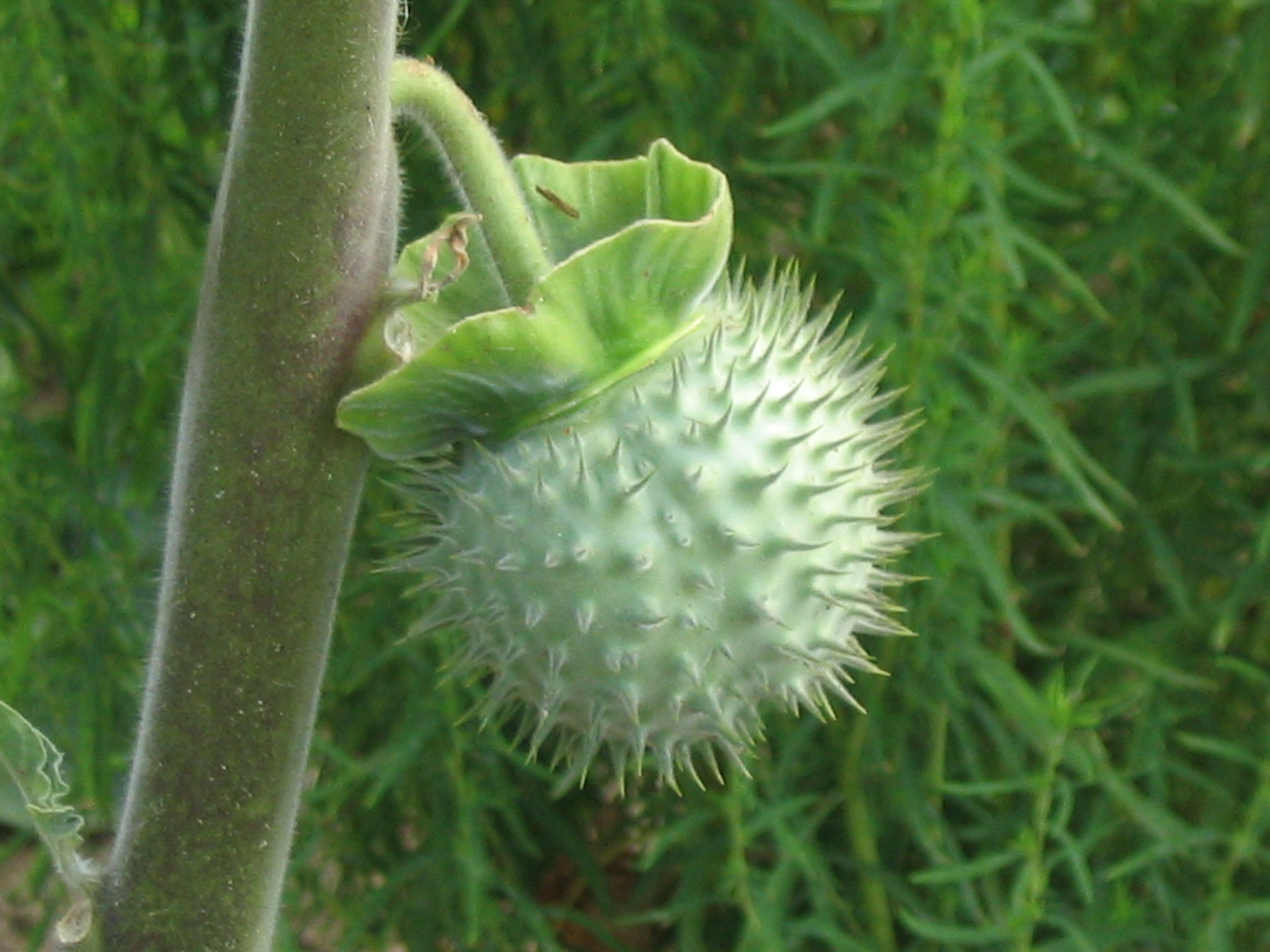
Fruit

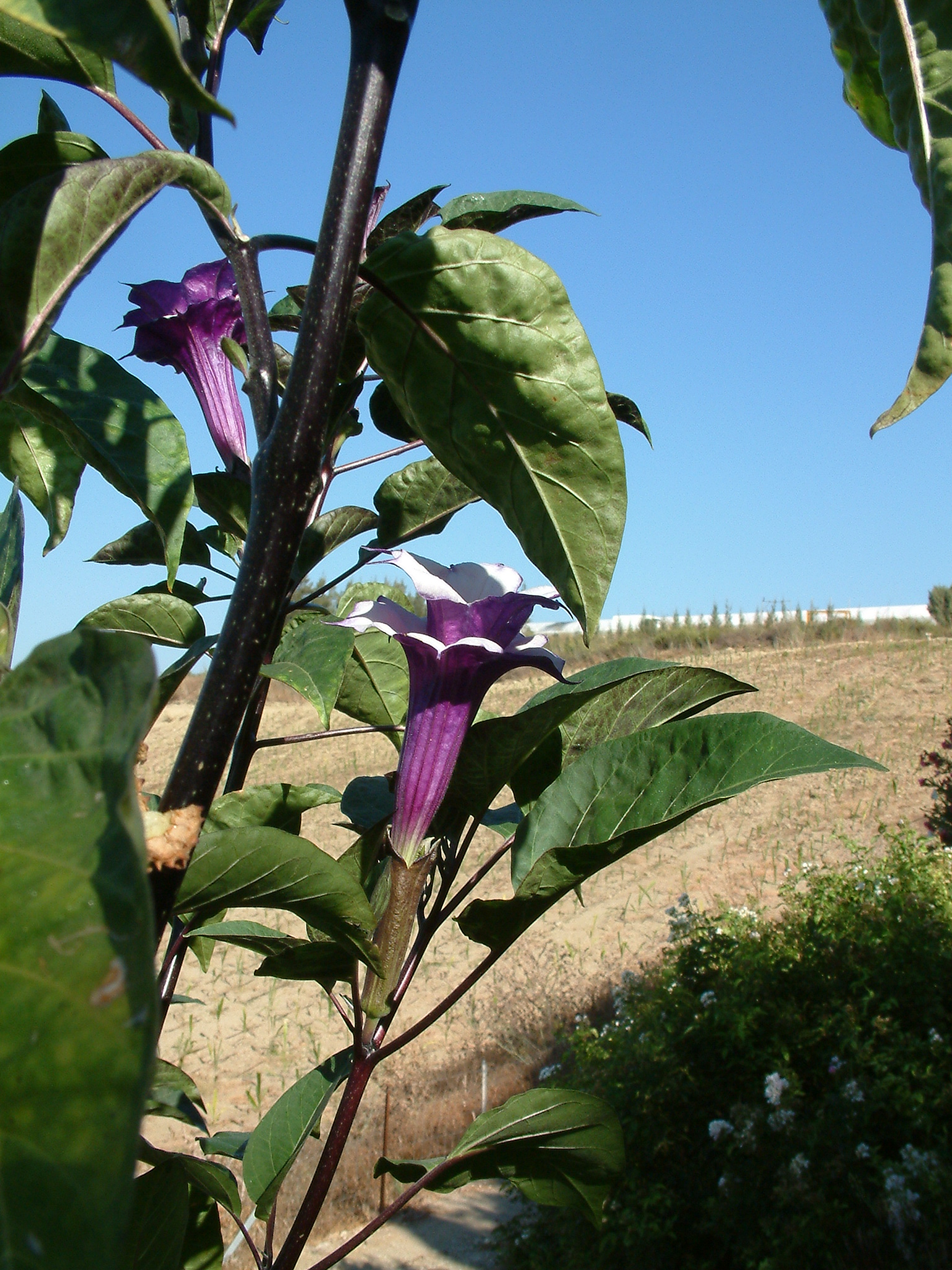
Datura metel 'Fastuosa' (Hindi: काला धतूरा kāla dhatūra – "black datura")

Datura species are usually sown annually from the seed produced in the spiny capsules, but, with care, the tuberous-rooted perennial species may be overwintered. Most species are suited to being planted outside or in containers. As a rule, they need warm, sunny places and soil that will keep their roots dry. When grown outdoors in good locations, the plants tend to reseed themselves and may become invasive. In containers, they should have porous, aerated potting soil with adequate drainage. The plants are susceptible to fungi in the root area, so anaerobic organic enrichment such as anaerobically composted organic matter or manure, should be avoided.

== Toxicity ==
All Datura plants contain tropane alkaloids such as scopolamine and atropine, primarily in their seeds and flowers, as well as the roots of certain species such as D. wrightii. Because of the presence of these substances, Datura has been used for centuries in some cultures as a poison. A given plant's toxicity depends on its age, where it is growing, and the local weather conditions. These variations make Datura exceptionally hazardous as a drug. Since datura directly causes the effects of anticholinergic syndrome, the symptoms of its toxicity are often cited by the traditional mnemonic: "Blind as a bat, mad as a hatter, red as a beet, hot as a hare, dry as a bone, the bowel and bladder lose their tone, and the heart runs alone". Datura, as well as long-term psychoactive/toxic usage of other anticholinergic drugs, also appear to significantly increase the risk of developing dementia.

In traditional cultures, a great deal of experience with and detailed knowledge of Datura was critical to minimize harm. Many tragic incidents result from modern users ingesting or smoking Datura. For example, in the 1990s and 2000s, the United States media reported stories of adolescents and young adults dying or becoming seriously ill from intentionally ingesting Datura. Deliberate or inadvertent poisoning resulting from smoking jimsonweed and other related species has been reported as well. Although most poisonings occur with more common species of Datura such as D. stramonium, several reports in the medical literature indicate deaths from D. ferox intoxication. Children are especially vulnerable to atropine poisoning.

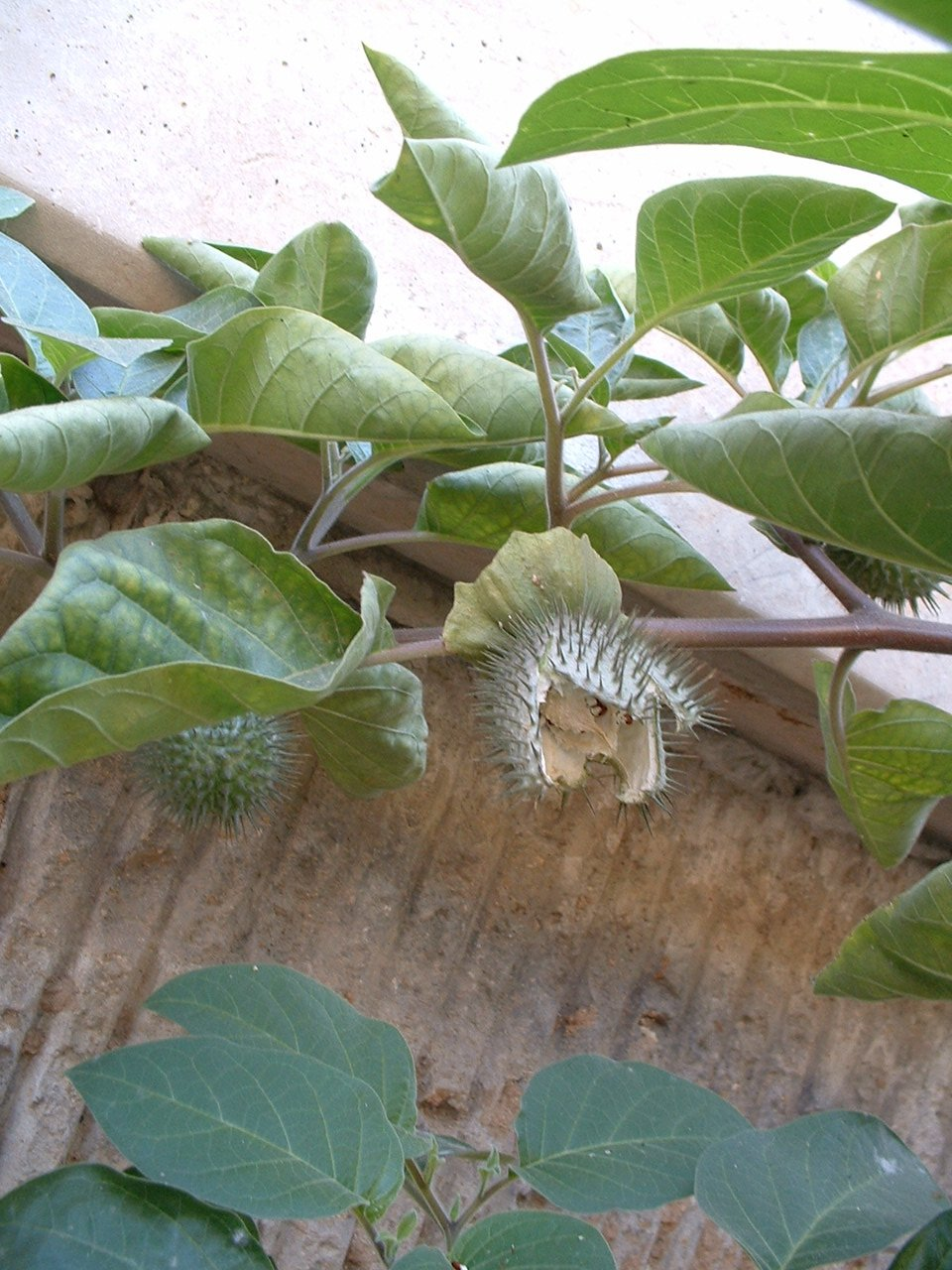
D. inoxia with ripe, split-open fruit

In some parts of Europe and India, Datura has been a popular poison for suicide and murder. From 1950 to 1965, the State Chemical Laboratories in Agra, India, investigated 2,778 deaths caused by ingesting Datura. A group called Thugs (practicers of thuggee) were reportedly devotees of an Indian religious cult made up of robbers and assassins who strangled or poisoned their victims in rituals devoted to the Hindu goddess Kali. They were alleged to employ Datura in many such poisonings, using it also to induce drowsiness or stupefaction, making strangulation easier.

Datura toxins may be ingested accidentally by consumption of honey produced by several wasp species, including Brachygastra lecheguana, during the Datura blooming season. These semi-domesticated honey wasps apparently collect Datura nectar for honey production, which can lead to poisoning.

The U.S. Centers for Disease Control and Prevention reported accidental poisoning resulting in hospitalization for a family of six who inadvertently ingested Datura used as an ingredient in stew.

In some places around the world, such as India due to the Drug & Cosmetic Act 1940 & Rule 1995, buying, selling, or cultivating Datura plants is prohibited. Solanaceous tribes with a similar chemistry (i.e. a similar tropane alkaloid content), include the Hyoscyameae, containing such well-known toxic species as Hyoscyamus niger and Atropa belladonna, the Solandreae containing the genus Solandra ("chalice vines") and the Mandragoreae, named for the famous Mandragora officinarum, most of which are considered traditional witches' herbs and poisons.

== Effects of ingestion ==
Datura is considered a deliriant. Due to the potent combination of anticholinergic substances it contains, Datura intoxication typically produces the effects of anticholinergic delirium (usually involving a complete or relative inability to differentiate reality from fantasy); bizarre thoughts, hyperthermia; tachycardia; bizarre and possibly violent behavior; dry skin; dry mouth; illusions; and severe mydriasis (dilated pupils) with resultant painful photophobia that can last several days. Muscle stiffness, urinary retention, temporary paralysis, disrobing, emotional blunting, dysphoria and confusion are often reported, and pronounced amnesia is another commonly reported effect. The psychoactive alkaloids scopolamine and atropine are also both known for their characteristic hyperactive effects and ability to cause stark and dream-like hallucinations. The onset of symptoms generally occurs around 30 to 60 minutes after ingesting the herb. These symptoms generally last from 24 to 48 hours, but have been reported in some cases to last two weeks or longer.

=== Treatment ===
Due to their agitated behavior and confused mental state, people with acute Datura poisoning or intoxication are typically hospitalized. Gastric lavage and the administration of activated charcoal can be used to reduce the stomach's absorption of the ingested material, and the drug physostigmine is used to reverse the effect of the poisons. Benzodiazepines can be given to calm the patient's agitation, and supportive care with oxygen, hydration and symptomatic treatment is often provided. Observation of the patient is indicated until the symptoms resolve, usually from 24 to 36 hours after ingestion of the Datura.

== Psychoactive use ==
In Pharmacology and Abuse of Cocaine, Amphetamines, Ecstasy and Related Designer Drugs, Freye asserts, "Few substances have received as many severely negative recreational experience reports as has Datura." The overwhelming majority of those who describe their use of Datura find their experiences extremely unpleasant—both mentally and often physically. However, anthropologists have found that indigenous groups, with a great deal of experience and detailed knowledge of Datura, have been known to use Datura spiritually (including the Navajo and especially the Havasupai). Adequate knowledge of Datura's properties is necessary to facilitate a safe experience. The ancient inhabitants of what became central and southern California used to ingest Datura to "commune with deities through visions". The Southern Paiute believe Datura can help locate missing objects. In ancient Mexico, Datura also played an important role in the religion of the Aztecs and the practices of their medicine men and necromancers. It was reportedly used by the Aztecs for ritual sacrifice and malevolent purposes as well. In modern-day Mexico, some Datura species are still used for sorcery and other occult practices, mostly in the southern region of Veracruz, specifically in the city of Catemaco. In Afghanistan, it was used by the Malang as a shamanic initiation rite and to contact the "other-world".

Bernardino de Sahagún, in around 1569, called attention to Datura in these words: "It is administered in potions in order to cause harm to those who are objects of hatred. Those who eat it have visions of fearful things. Magicians or those who wish to harm someone administer it in food or drink. This herb is medicinal and its seed is used as a remedy for gout, ground up and applied to the part affected."

Christian Rätsch has said, "A mild dosage produces medicinal and healing effects, a moderate dosage produces aphrodisiac effects, and high dosages are used for shamanic purposes". Wade Davis, an ethnobotanist, also lists it as an essential ingredient of a zombie potion in Haitian Vodou. In Western culture, the same species (Datura stramonium) has been said to have been commonly used by witches as an ingredient for their flying ointments and was regularly included in detailed recipes of magical ointments dating back as far as the early modern period, predominately in New England and Western Europe. During the anti-witchcraft hysteria of colonial times it was considered unlucky or inappropriate to grow D. stramonium in one's garden due to its supposed reputation for aiding in incantations.

== Gallery ==
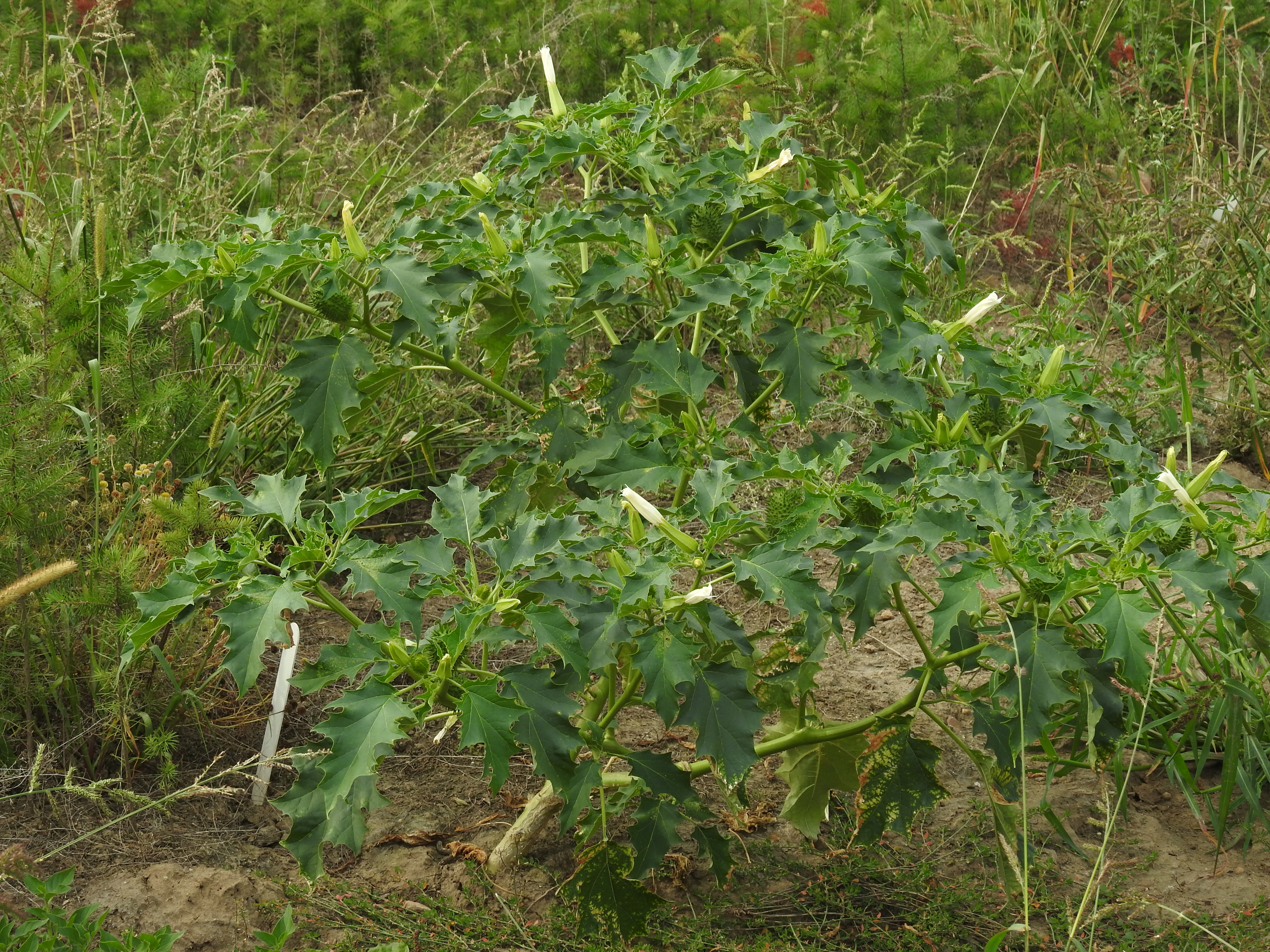
D. stramonium (lateral view) near Frankfurt, Hesse, Germany

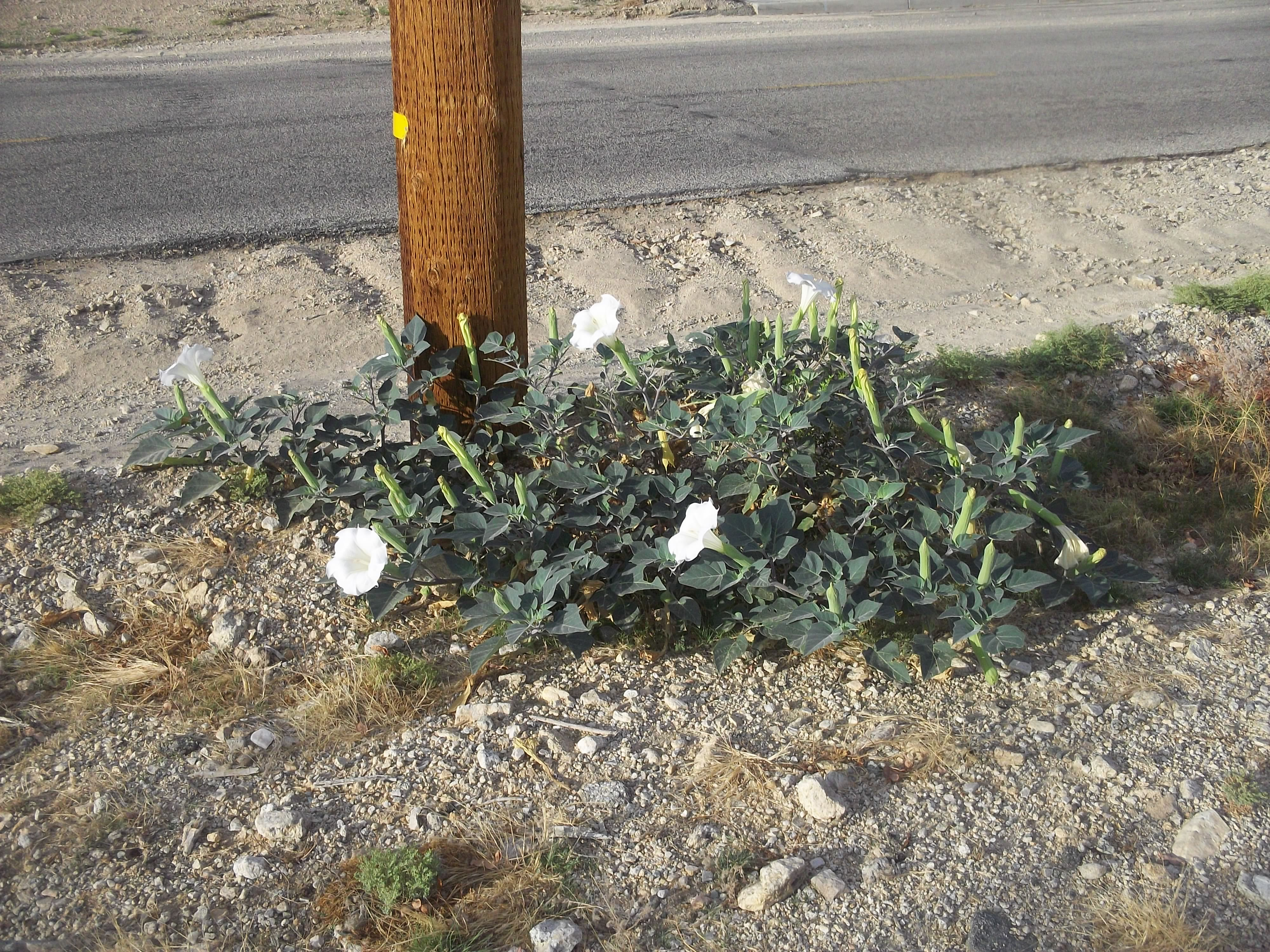
D. wrightii in bloom (lateral view) near Twentynine Palms, California, U.S.

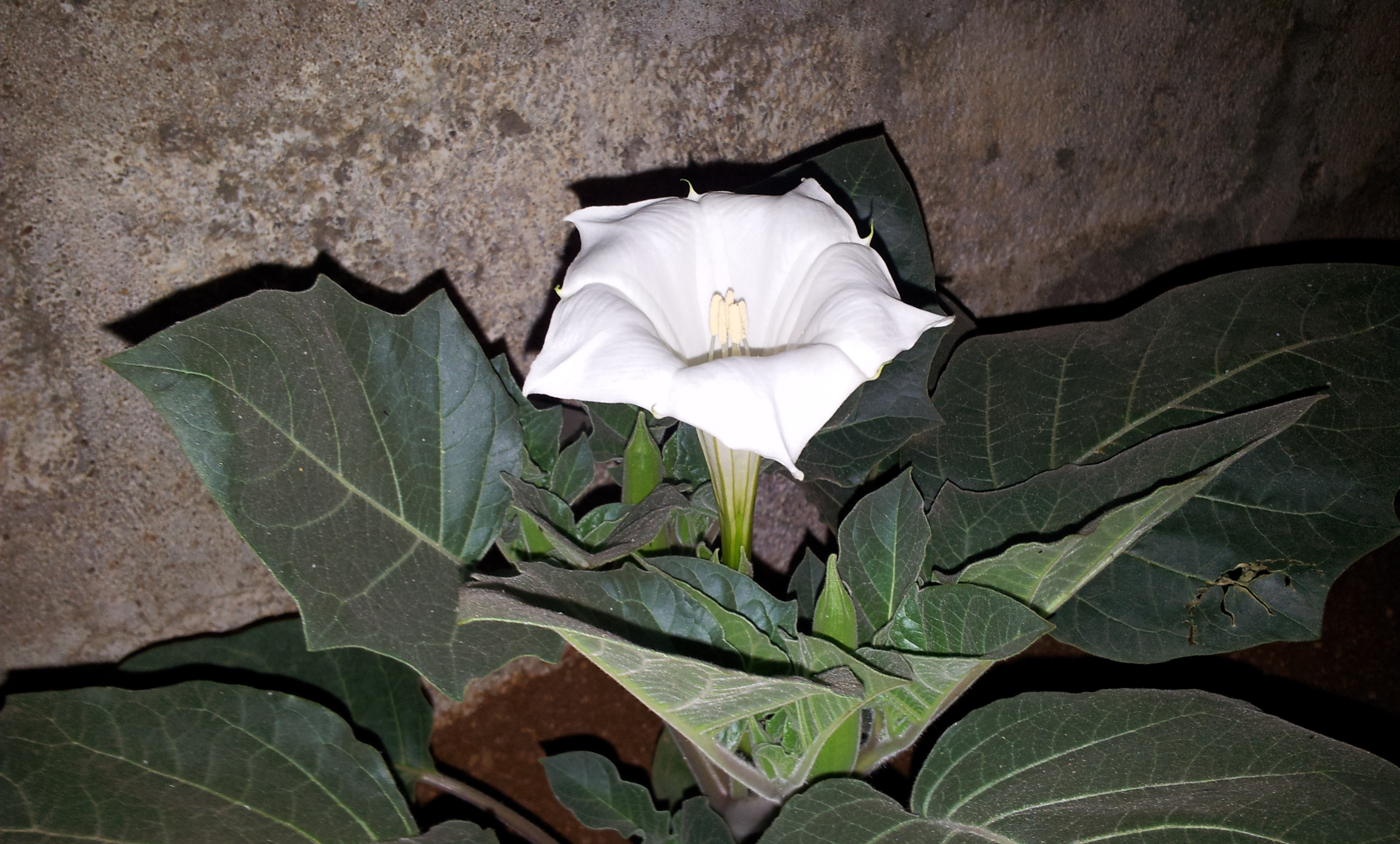
Datura flower on the plant (lateral view) near Hyderabad, Telangana, India

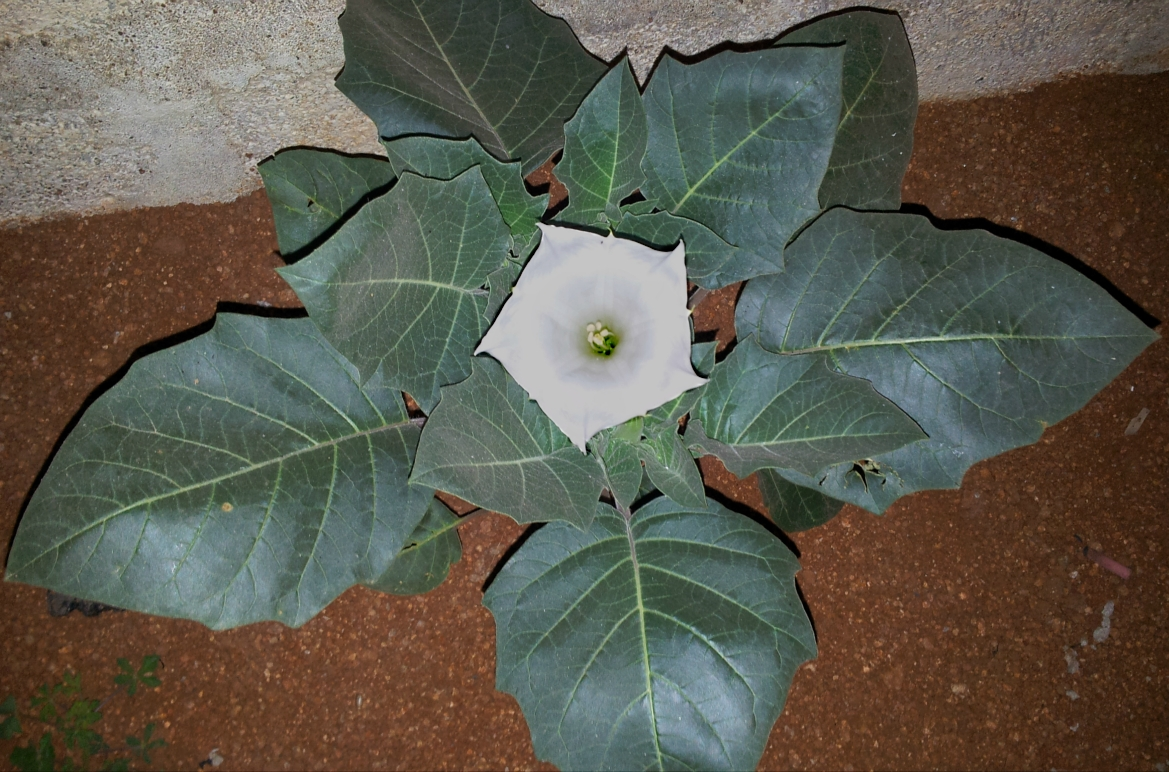
Datura flower on the plant (top view) near Hyderabad, Telangana, India

== See also ==
- Anticholinergic
- List of poisonous plants
- Muscarinic antagonist
- Psychoactive plant
- Scopolamine
