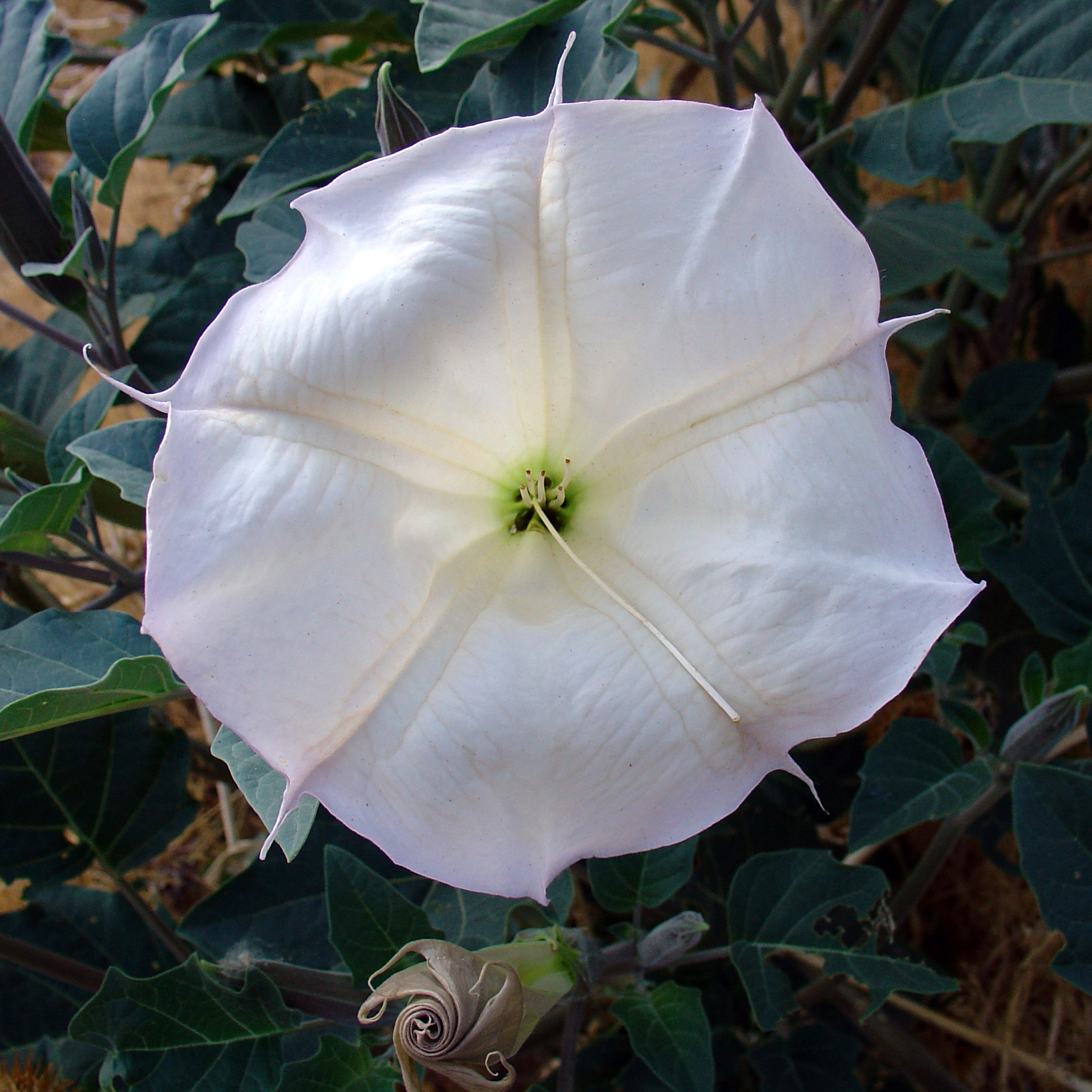
- Sacred datura in bloom, with opening bud below

Conservation status
- Secure (NatureServe)

Scientific classification
- Kingdom: Plantae
- Clade: Tracheophytes
- Clade: Angiosperms
- Clade: Eudicots
- Clade: Asterids
- Order: Solanales
- Family: Solanaceae
- Genus: Datura
- Species: D. wrightii

Binomial name
- Datura wrightii Regel

= Datura wrightii =

Sacred datura

Species of plant in southwestern North America

Datura wrightii, commonly known as sacred datura, is a poisonous perennial plant species and ornamental flower of the family Solanaceae native to the Southwestern United States and northwestern Mexico. It is sometimes used as a hallucinogen due to its psychoactive alkaloids. D. wrightii is classified as an anticholinergic deliriant.

== Taxonomy ==
German botanist Eduard August von Regel described the species in 1859 from material collected in Texas by botanist Charles Wright, and named it after him.

The scientific name has frequently been given as Datura meteloides Dunal, but this name is actually a synonym of D. innoxia Mill., a Mexican plant with a narrower flower having 10 rather than five "teeth" at the rim.

Common names in the US include "sacred thorn-apple" or "hairy thornapple", and sometimes "western Jimson weed" because of its resemblance to Datura stramonium due to both species having toothed leaves. Anglophone settlers in California often called it "Indian whiskey" because of its ritual intoxicating use by many tribes; the name "sacred datura" has the same origin. Other common names include "Indian apple", "California jimson weed" and "nightshade" (not to be confused with Solanum). The Tongva call it manit and the Chumash momoy. In Mexico, people call this and similar species tolguacha. or toloache.

== Description ==
It is a vigorous herbaceous perennial that grows 30 cm to 1.5 m tall and wide. The leaves are broad and rounded at the base, tapering to a point, often with wavy margins. The flowers are the most striking feature, being sweetly fragrant white trumpets up to 20 cm (7.9 in) long, sometimes tinted purple, especially at the margin. Five narrow points are spaced symmetrically around the rim. The plants often can be seen as a ground vine in habit, growing close to the ground and spreading in a very exposed environment with full direct sunlight (cleared roadside). D. wrightii, blooms from April through October. In clear weather, flowers open in the morning and evening and close during the heat of the day (depending on water availability); in cloudy weather, they may open earlier and last longer.

The seeds are borne in a spiny, globular capsule 3 to 4 cm in diameter, which opens when fully ripe.

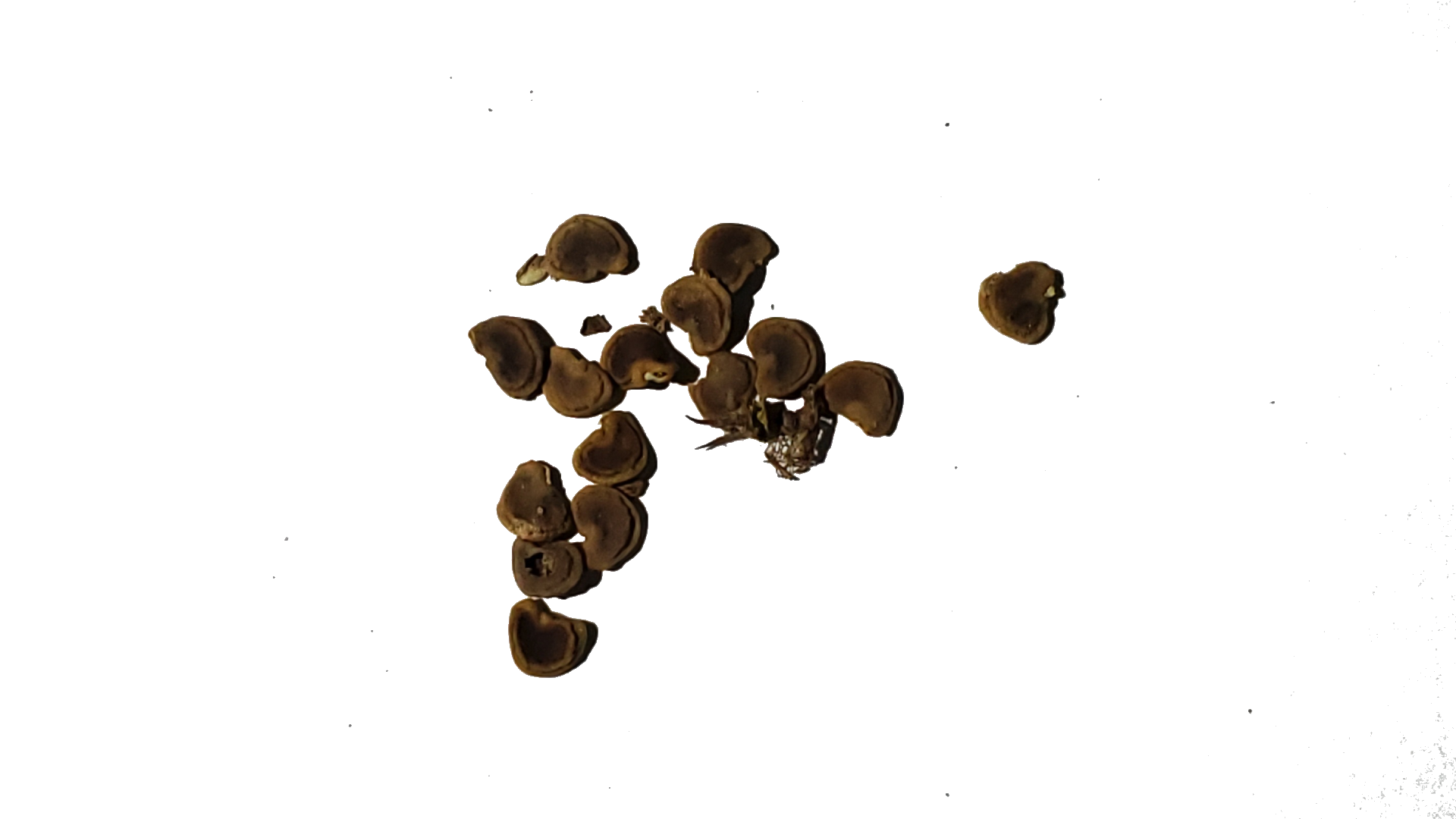
Seeds

In Europe D. wrightii has often been confused with Datura innoxia as both are hairy with hanging spined fruits. They can be differentiated by the hairs on the stems and stalks, which for D. wrightii are densely appressed (visually and in photos this makes the stems look near-uniformly dull) and for D. innoxia projecting (making the stems dull at the edges and brighter, greener or shiny along the centre where the hairs project toward the eye). The flowers of D. wrightii are larger (14-26 cm) and have 5 cusps, with stigmas above the anthers often exserted, vs. D. innoxia smaller (12-16 cm) with often 10 cusps and stigmas below the anthers.

== Distribution and habitat ==
Datura wrightii is found in northern Mexico and the adjoining southwestern U. S. states, as far north as Eastern Washington, in open / disturbed land and along roadsides with well-drained (sandy) soils. However it is perhaps most naturally abundant in the region of Southern California. It is also commonly planted as an ornamental, especially in xeriscapes due to its ruderal characteristics.

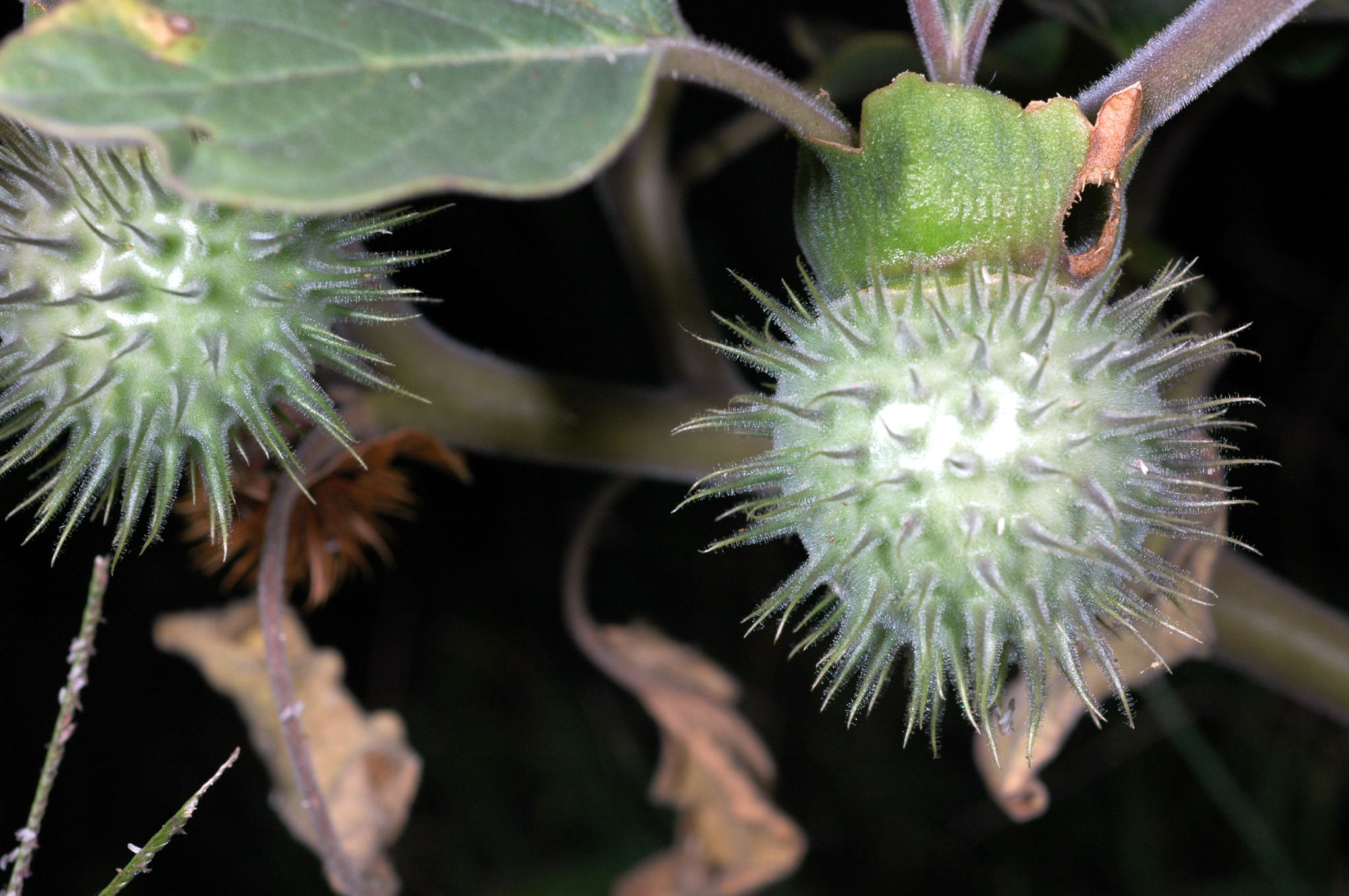
Prickly seed capsules

=== Invasive status ===
In Australia, it has been recorded as a garden escapee in New South Wales, Victoria, South Australia and Western Australia.

== Toxicity ==
All parts of Datura plants contain dangerous levels of anticholinergic tropane alkaloids and may be fatal if ingested by humans, livestock, or pets. In some places, it is prohibited to buy, sell or cultivate Datura plants. Unlike other types of datura, the roots are considered the most potent and alkaloid-rich part of this species.

== Uses ==
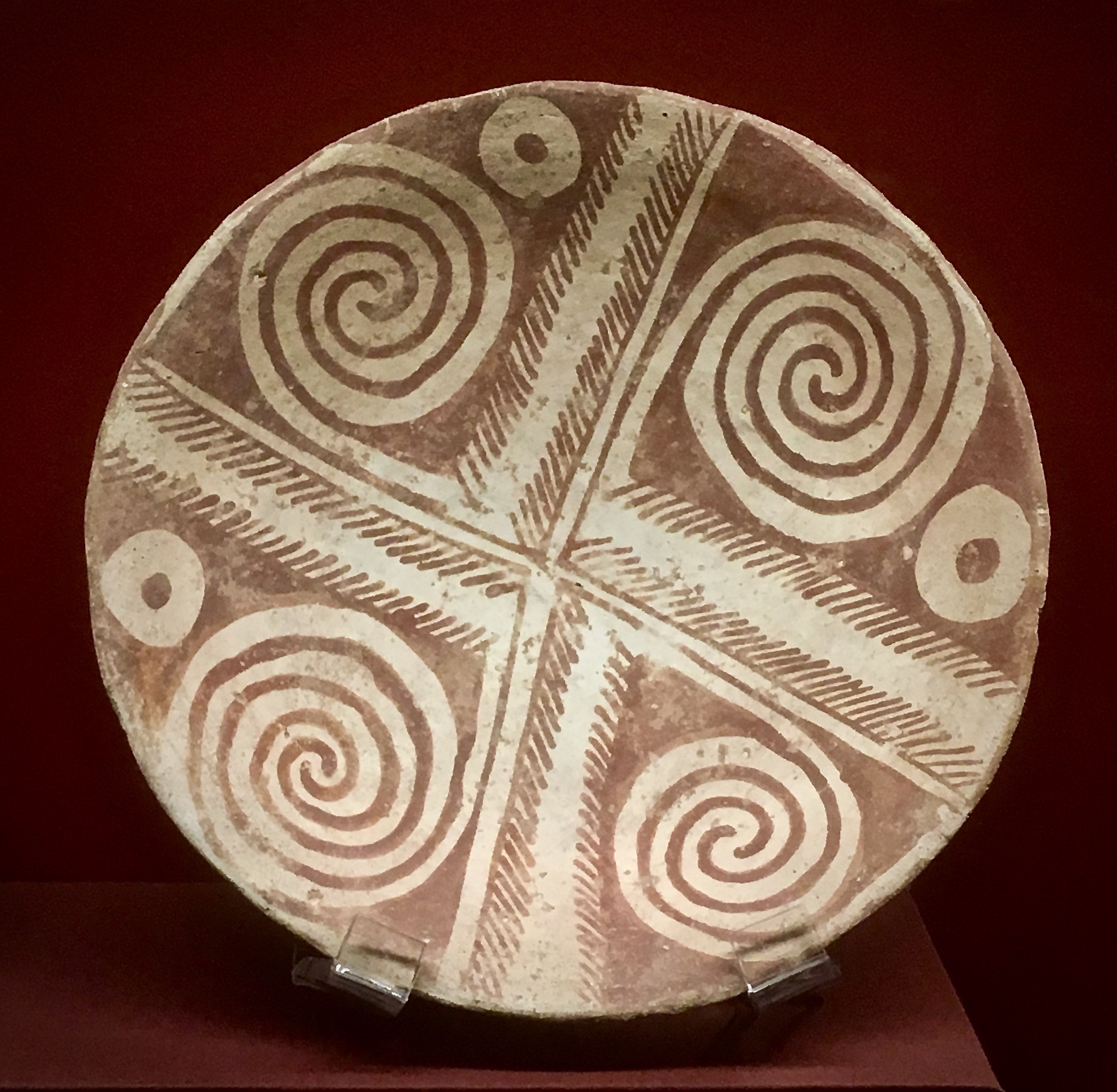
Unfolding Sacred Datura buds painted on a Hohokam Sacaton red-on-buff plate, ca. 950-1150 AD. This was a common decorative motif on ancient Native American pottery. Note the opening spiral of the bud on the photo at top of this page.

=== Medicinal ===
Among the Zuni people, the powdered root is given as an anesthetic and a narcotic for surgery. They also apply a poultice of root and flower meal applied to wounds to promote healing. The Zuni used Datura as a way to render patients unconscious while broken bones were set.

=== Religious ===
Southern California has been the site of various toloache (datura) based religions. Datura wrightii is sacred to some Native Americans and has been used in ceremonies and rites of passage by Chumash, Tongva, and others. Among the Chumash, when a boy was 8 years old, his mother gave him a preparation of momoy to drink. This was supposed to be a spiritual challenge to the boy to help him develop the spiritual well-being required to become a man. Not all of the boys survived. The Zuni people also use the plant for ceremonial, magical, and divinatory purposes. The root pieces are chewed by a robbery victim to determine the identity of the thief. The powdered root is also used by rain priests in a number of ways to ensure fruitful rains.

=== Recreational ===
Datura wrightii has also been used to induce hallucination for recreational purposes. Internal use of the plant material can induce auditory and visual hallucinations similar to those of Datura stramonium, with the active compounds being concentrated in the seed capsules and roots; concentrations vary widely between samples, and onset is slow. This makes dosage estimation difficult and adds further risk to the administration of material that already has potentially lethal side effects. Scopolamine is the primary active molecule; it is related to atropine, with a similar, largely anticholinergic activity. Effects may include dry mouth, hyperthermia, profuse sweating, decreased sweating, impairment, drowsiness, restlessness, lethargy, illusions, changes in visual perception, delirium, psychosis and anterograde amnesia - along with the afore-mentioned hallucinations and sensory distortions. These compounds also induce a profound mydriasis and suppress eye saccades, resulting in considerable degradation of visual acuity, often to the point of functional blindness. This may persist, to a reduced degree, for days. The combined effect may result in a panic state in the user, a particularly dangerous situation in someone temporarily deprived of useful vision; users are prone to serious accidental injury. Scopolamine induces respiratory depression at hallucinogenic doses. The combination of anesthesia (in the hospital) and Datura is usually fatal due to combined respiratory depression. Seizures as well as fevers as high as 43 °C (109 °F) have been reported.

== In popular culture ==
The American artist Georgia O'Keeffe (1887–1986) painted "jimson weed" several times. She was fond of the flowers, which grew wild around her New Mexico house. These paintings of the exotic white pinwheel blooms, hugely magnified, are among her most familiar works. In 2014 one such painting sold for $44 million, a record price for a female artist's work. Given the location of O'Keeffe's residence in the New Mexico desert, it is likely that she saw 'western' jimson weed.

The plant is an element of Hunter S. Thompson's 1971 roman à clef novel, Fear and Loathing in Las Vegas: A Savage Journey to the Heart of the American Dream. In part 2, chapter 5 of the book, a jimsonweed experience is recounted by the character Dr. Gonzo as described here: "Last Christmas somebody gave me a whole Jimson weed – the root must have weighed two pounds; enough for a year – but I ate the whole goddamn thing in about twenty minutes... Luckily, I vomited most of it right back up. But even so, I went blind for three days. Christ I couldn't even walk! My whole body turned to wax. I was such a mess that they had to haul me back to the ranch house in a wheelbarrow... they said I was trying to talk, but I sounded like a raccoon." Due to the fact that Dr. Gonzo presumably lived in Los Angeles, California during this time, this encounter was likely also with the "western jimsonweed" species as well. It could have also been Datura innoxia, but since the author has passed, we may never know which he intended.
