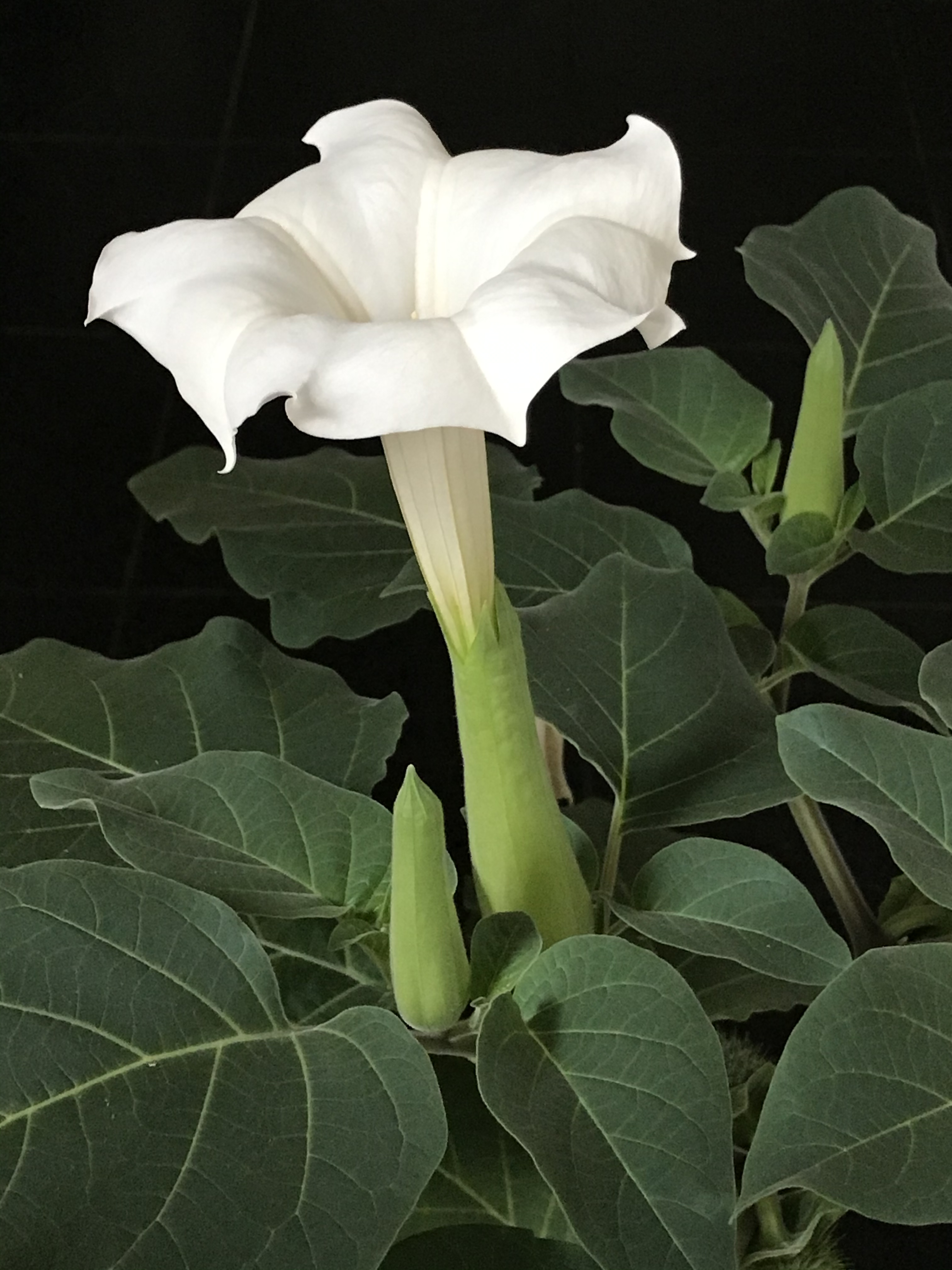
- In cultivation

Scientific classification
- Kingdom: Plantae
- Clade: Tracheophytes
- Clade: Angiosperms
- Clade: Eudicots
- Clade: Asterids
- Order: Solanales
- Family: Solanaceae
- Genus: Datura
- Species: D. innoxia

Binomial name
- Datura innoxia Mill.

Synonyms
- Datura inoxia (orthographic variant)

= Datura innoxia =

Species of plant

Datura innoxia (often spelled inoxia), known as pricklyburr, recurved thorn-apple, downy thorn-apple, Indian-apple, lovache, moonflower, nacazcul, toloatzin, toloaxihuitl, tolguache or toloache, is a species of flowering plant in the family Solanaceae. It is more rarely called sacred datura, a common name which is applied more often to the closely related Datura wrightii. It is native to the Southwestern United States, Central and South America, and introduced in Africa, Asia, Australia and Europe. The scientific name is often cited as D. innoxia. When English botanist Philip Miller first described the species in 1768, he misspelled the Latin word innoxia (inoffensive) when naming it D. inoxia. The name Datura meteloides was for some time erroneously applied to some members of the species, but that name has now been abandoned.

== Description ==
Datura innoxia is a tuberous-rooted subshrub that typically reaches a height of 0.6 to 1.5 metres. Its stems and leaves are covered with short and soft grayish hairs, giving the whole plant a grayish appearance. It has elliptic smooth-edged leaves with pinnate venation. All parts of the plant emit a foul odor similar to rancid peanut butter when crushed or bruised, although most people find the fragrance of the flowers to be quite pleasant when they bloom at night.

The flowers are white, trumpet-shaped, 12–19 cm (4.5–7.5 in) long. They first grow upright, and later incline downward. It flowers from early summer until late fall.

The fruit is an egg-shaped spiny capsule, about 5 cm in diameter. Like those of other species belonging to section Dutra of the genus Datura, it splits open irregularly when ripe to disperse its seeds. Another means of dispersal may also occur, in which the spiny fruit becomes entangled in the fur of animals, who then carry the fruit far from the mother plant. The seeds are long-lived, having the ability to lie dormant in the soil for many years. The seeds and indeed the whole plant, have strongly deliriant properties and a high potential for overdose; the slow appearance of the effects leading to the erroneous belief that the dose taken has been ineffective.

In Europe often confused with Datura wrightii, for the distinction see that species.

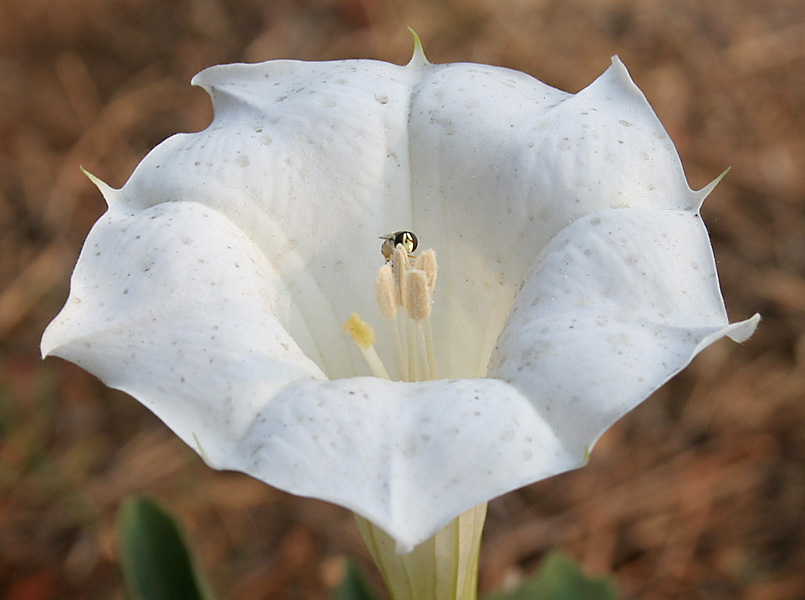
Flower in Hyderabad, India

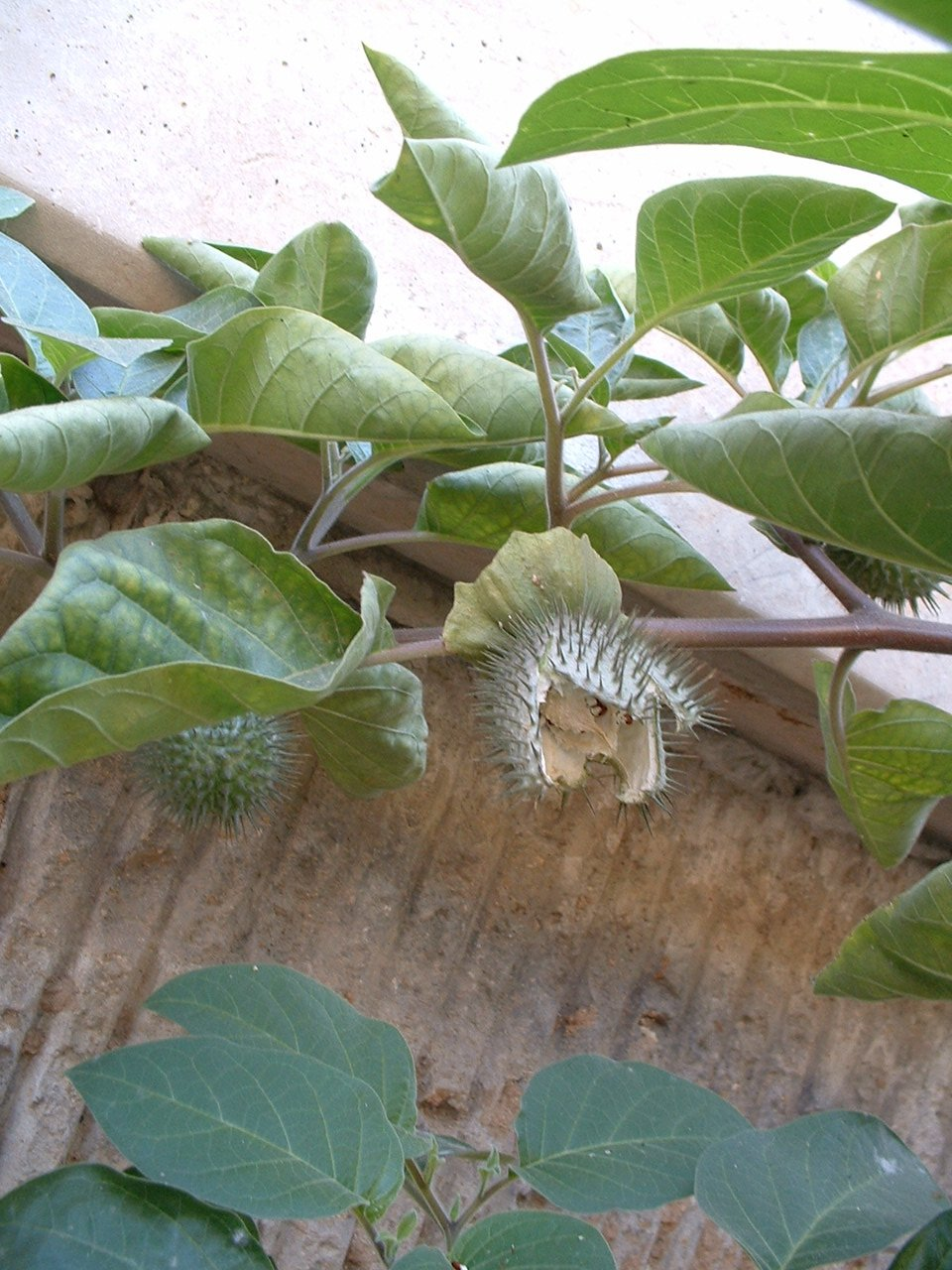
Ripe, irregularly-dehiscent capsule

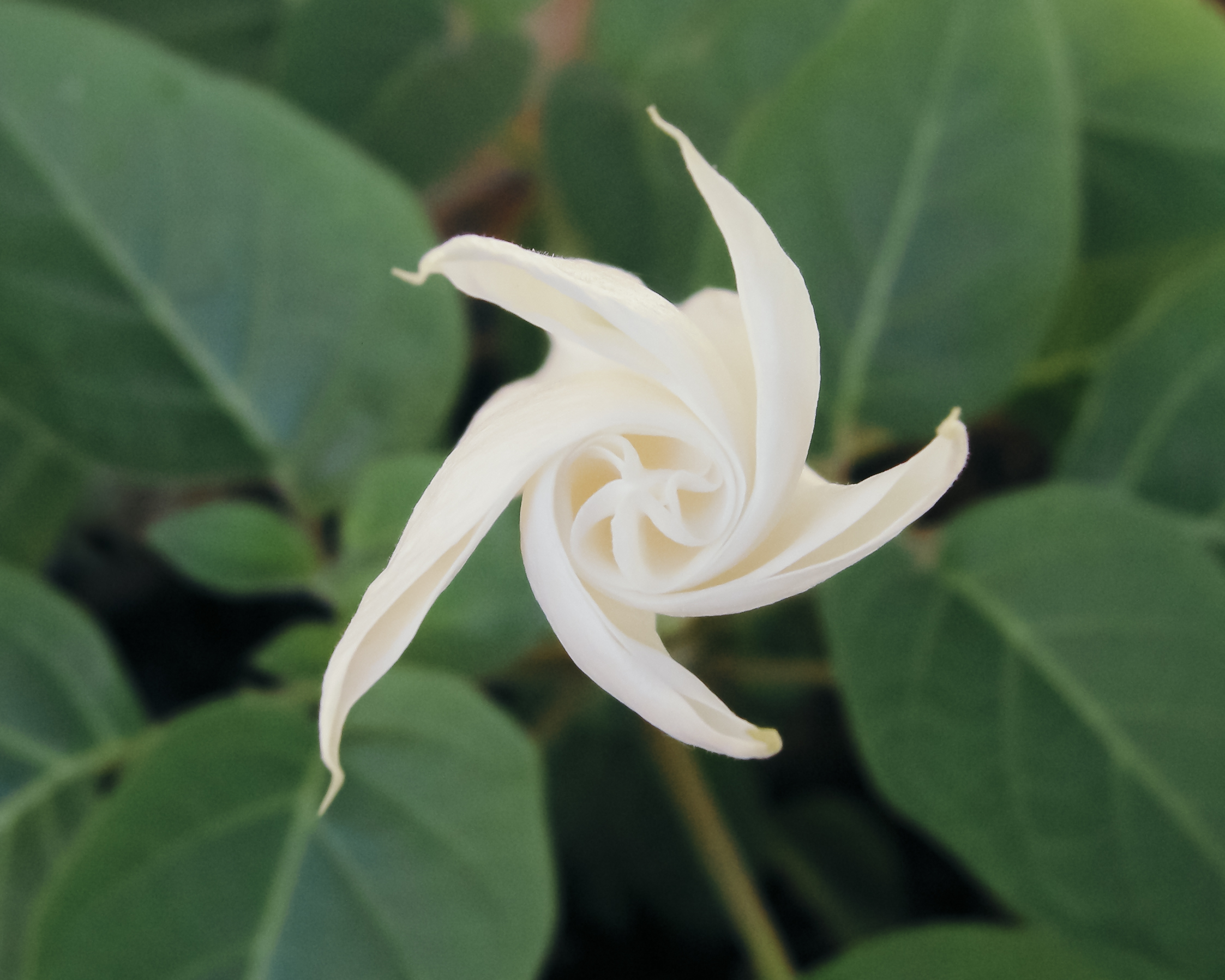
Datura innoxia beginning to bloom

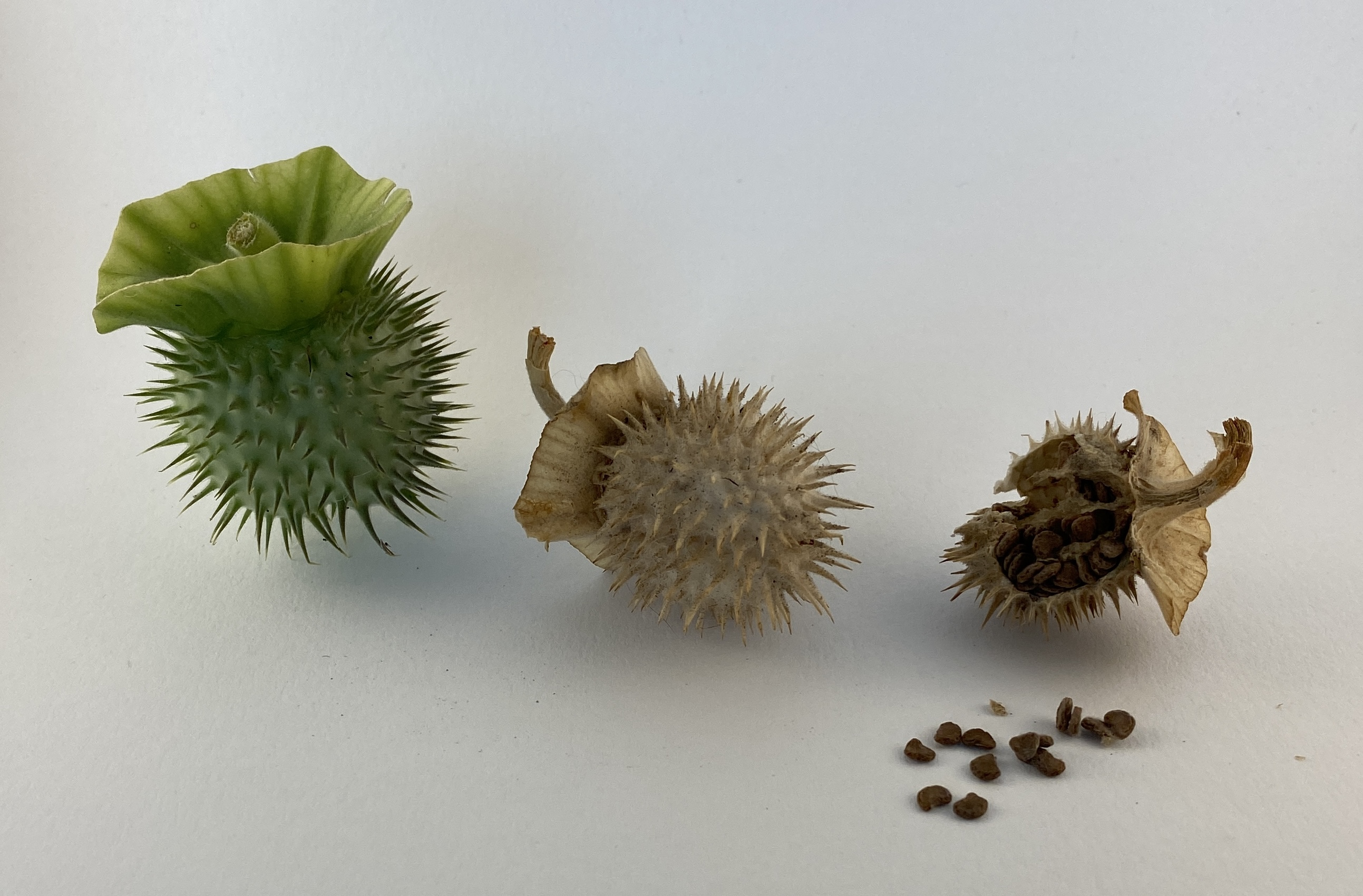
Datura innoxia ripe fruit, dried fruit and seeds

=== Similar species ===
Datura innoxia is quite similar to D. metel, to the point of being confused with it in early scientific literature. D. metel is a closely related plant, believed until recently to be of Old World provenance (though now thought to have been brought to Asia from the Antilles no earlier than the sixteenth century) and misconstrued as being referred to in the works of Avicenna in eleventh century Persia. D. stramonium differs in having much smaller flowers, seed capsules dehisceing by four distinct valves, and dentate leaves, while the more closely related D. wrightii differs in having wider, 5-toothed (instead of 10-toothed) flowers which are usually pinkish-violet rather than white. D. innoxia differs from D. stramonium, D. metel and D. fastuosa in having about 7 to 10 secondary veins on either side of the midrib of the leaf which anastomose by arches at about 1 to 3 mm. from the margin. No anastomosis of the secondary veins are seen in the other 4 major species of Datura.

== Nomenclature ==
The currently-accepted botanical name for this plant is Datura innoxia, in spite of the fact that many references spell it Datura inoxia. According to Tropicos, a widely accepted authority on botanical names, the inoxia form is due to an error originally made by 18th-century taxonomist Philip Miller, and since corrected.

Miller wrote that the "not noxious" name refers to the soft spines on the fruit, which are in contrast to the sharp spines on other Datura species. (Miller refers to the "oval fruit, covered with long, soft, innocent spines".)

== Toxicity ==
All parts of Datura plants are toxic, containing dangerous levels of tropane alkaloids (hyoscyamine, hyoscine) and may be fatal if ingested by humans and other animals, including livestock and pets. The main observed effects of ingestion are enlarged pupils, dry mouth, trouble breathing, blurred vision, hallucinations, panic, death. In some places, it is prohibited to buy, sell or cultivate Datura plants.

== Uses ==
When cultivated, the plant is usually treated as an annual to be grown from seed, but its tuberous roots (somewhat reminiscent of those of the cultivated Dahlia) can be kept from freezing and planted in the spring of the following year.

Datura innoxia, like other Datura species, contains the highly toxic alkaloids atropine, hyoscine (scopolamine), and hyoscyamine. The Aztecs called the plant by the Nahuatl names toloatzin and toloaxihuitl (trans. "the plant with the nodding head", in reference to the nodding seed capsules) and used it long before the Spanish conquest of Mexico for many therapeutic purposes, such as poultices for wounds where it acts as an anodyne. Although the Aztecs warned against madness and "various and vain imaginings", many Native Americans have used the plant as an entheogen for hallucinations and rites of passage. The alkaloids of these plants are very similar to those of mandrake, deadly nightshade, and henbane, which are also highly poisonous plants used cautiously for effective pain relief in antiquity.

Datura intoxication typically produces a complete inability to differentiate reality from fantasy (delirium, as contrasted to hallucination); hyperthermia; tachycardia; bizarre, and possibly violent behavior; and severe mydriasis with resultant painful photophobia that can last several days. Pronounced amnesia is another commonly reported effect. There can easily be a 5:1 variation in toxins from plant to plant, and a given plant's toxicity depends on its age, where it is growing, and local weather conditions. These wide variations make Datura exceptionally hazardous to use as a drug. In traditional cultures, users needed to have a great deal of experience and detailed plant knowledge so that no harm resulted from using it. Such knowledge is not widely available in modern cultures, so many unfortunate incidents result from ingesting Datura. In the 1990s and 2000s, the United States media contained stories of adolescents and young adults dying or becoming seriously ill from intentionally ingesting Datura.

It has also been planted throughout the world as an ornamental plant for its attractive large leaves, large white flowers, and distinctive thorny fruit. However, the plant is now considered an invasive species in several locations. For example, because of the similarity of its life cycle to that of cotton, it is a weed of cotton fields. It is also a potential seed contaminant.

== See also ==
- Daturadiol
- Daturaolone
