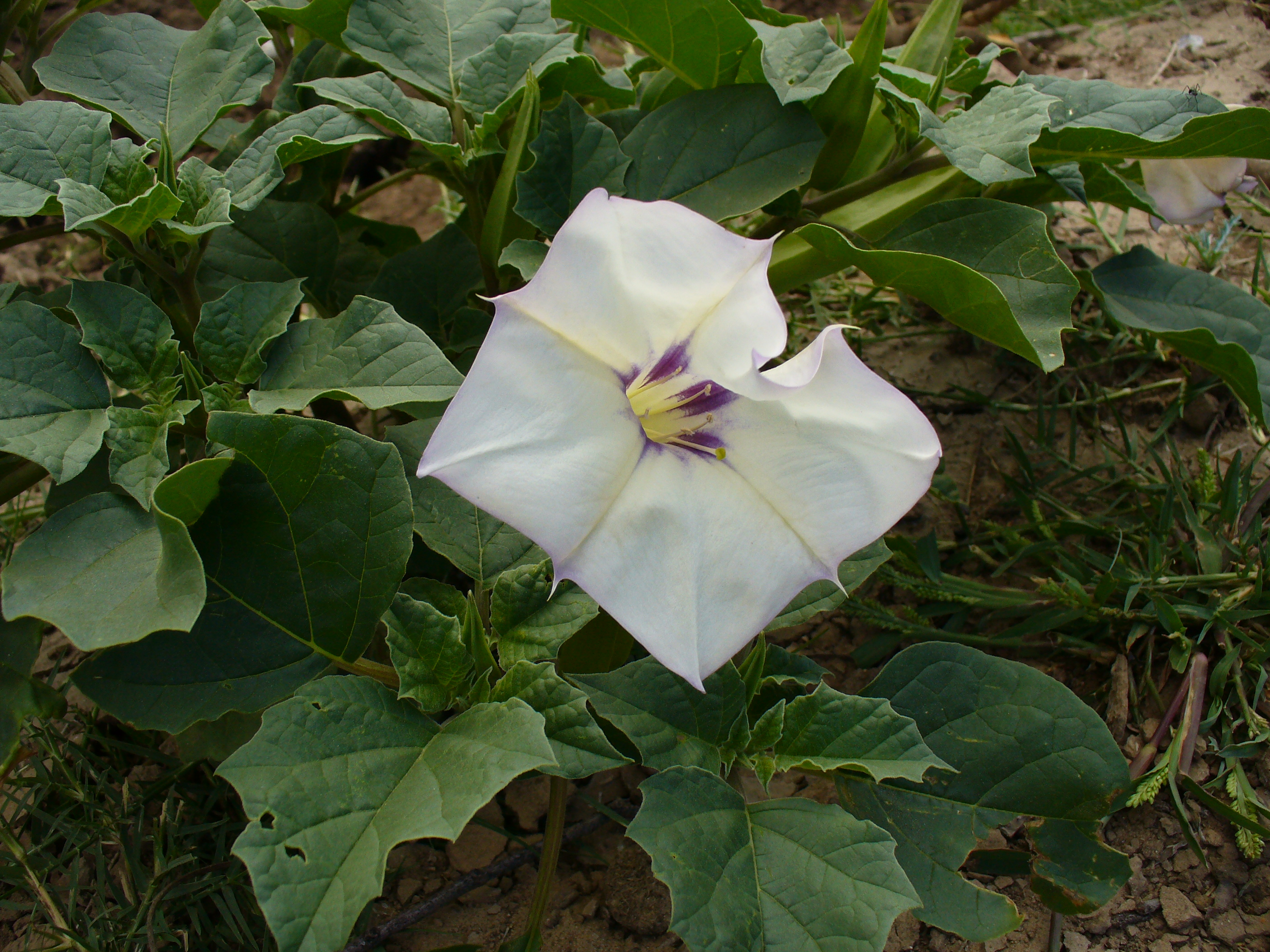

Scientific classification
- Kingdom: Plantae
- Clade: Tracheophytes
- Clade: Angiosperms
- Clade: Eudicots
- Clade: Asterids
- Order: Solanales
- Family: Solanaceae
- Genus: Datura
- Species: D. discolor

Binomial name
- Datura discolor Bernh.

= Datura discolor =

Species of plant

Datura discolor, also called the desert thorn-apple, is an herbaceous annual plant native to the Sonoran Desert of western North America, where it grows in sandy soils and washes. All parts of the plant contain a mix of alkaloids that are potentially lethal when enough is ingested.

== Description ==
The species was first described in 1833. The specific epithet discolor, meaning "various colors", refers to its upward-growing trumpet-shaped flowers, which are white in the bell, and pale to dark violet from the narrow part of the bell to the base. The plant itself is an upright or low-lying shrub that can grow to 4.5 feet (1.4 m) tall. Its foliage is light green, and its stalks have conspicuous purple stripes. The ovate-shaped leaves can be whole or toothed.

Datura discolor has large flowers, which makes it attractive for garden cultivation. The flowers open for only one night and wither the following day. Its seed capsule is thorny like most other datura species, and can be up to 3 in (76 mm) long and 2.5 in (64 mm) in diameter. The species' natural distribution area stretches from Mexico to the Southwestern U.S., and the Caribbean Islands. It is a sun-loving plant which does well underneath overhanging eaves that can protect its flowers from damage by rainfall. It grows in sandy and gravelly soils.

== Toxicity ==
All parts of Datura plants contain dangerous levels of poison and may be fatal if ingested by humans or other animals, including livestock and pets. In some places it is illegal to buy, sell or cultivate Datura plants.
