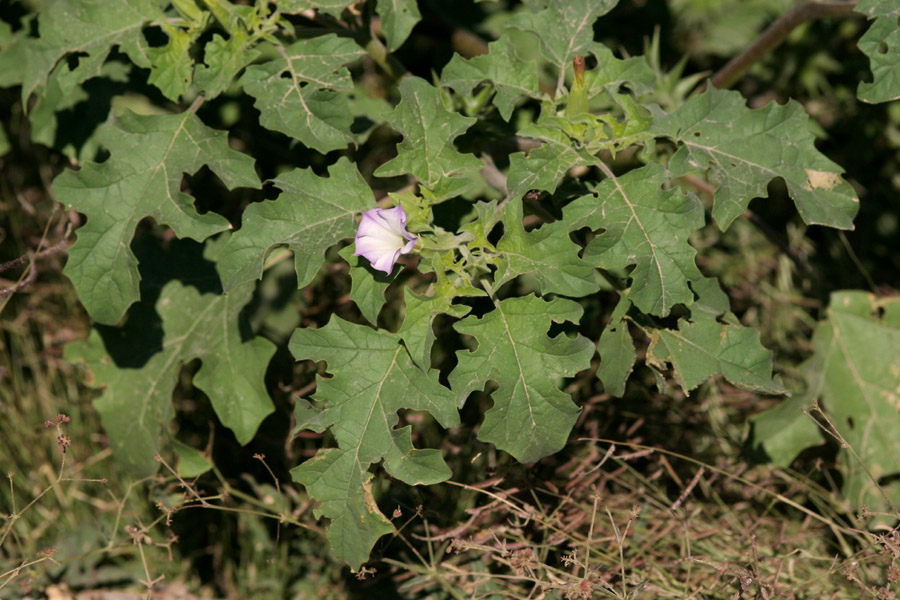

Scientific classification
- Kingdom: Plantae
- Clade: Tracheophytes
- Clade: Angiosperms
- Clade: Eudicots
- Clade: Asterids
- Order: Solanales
- Family: Solanaceae
- Genus: Datura
- Species: D. quercifolia

Binomial name
- Datura quercifolia Kunth

= Datura quercifolia =

Species of plant

Datura quercifolia, commonly known as the oak-leaved thorn-apple and also the Chinese Thorn-Apple, is a small shrub in the genus Datura that is native to Mexico and the Southwestern United States. It grows equally well in dry and moist soils and requires full sun. It contains a mix of alkaloids that are poisonous and can be potentially lethal when ingested.

== Description ==
The species was first described in 1818 by Alexander von Humboldt. Its green leaves resemble oak leaves, hence the name quercifolia.

It can assume both a prostrate and an upright bushy habit, with bushier forms reaching up to 3 ft. in height. It produces green seed capsules armed with long sharp spines, which, like those of some Datura species, open by four equal valves. The funnel-shaped flowers are white and pale violet tipped with five short triangular teeth and are less than 2 in. long.

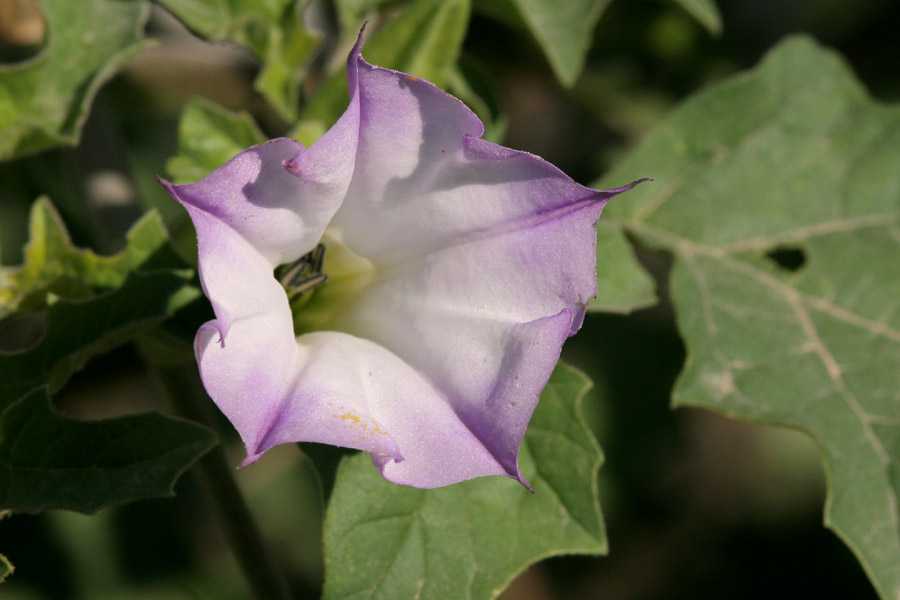
Flower

== Toxicity ==
All parts of Datura plants contain dangerous levels of poison and may be fatal if ingested by humans or other animals, including livestock and pets. In some places it is prohibited to buy, sell or cultivate Datura plants.
