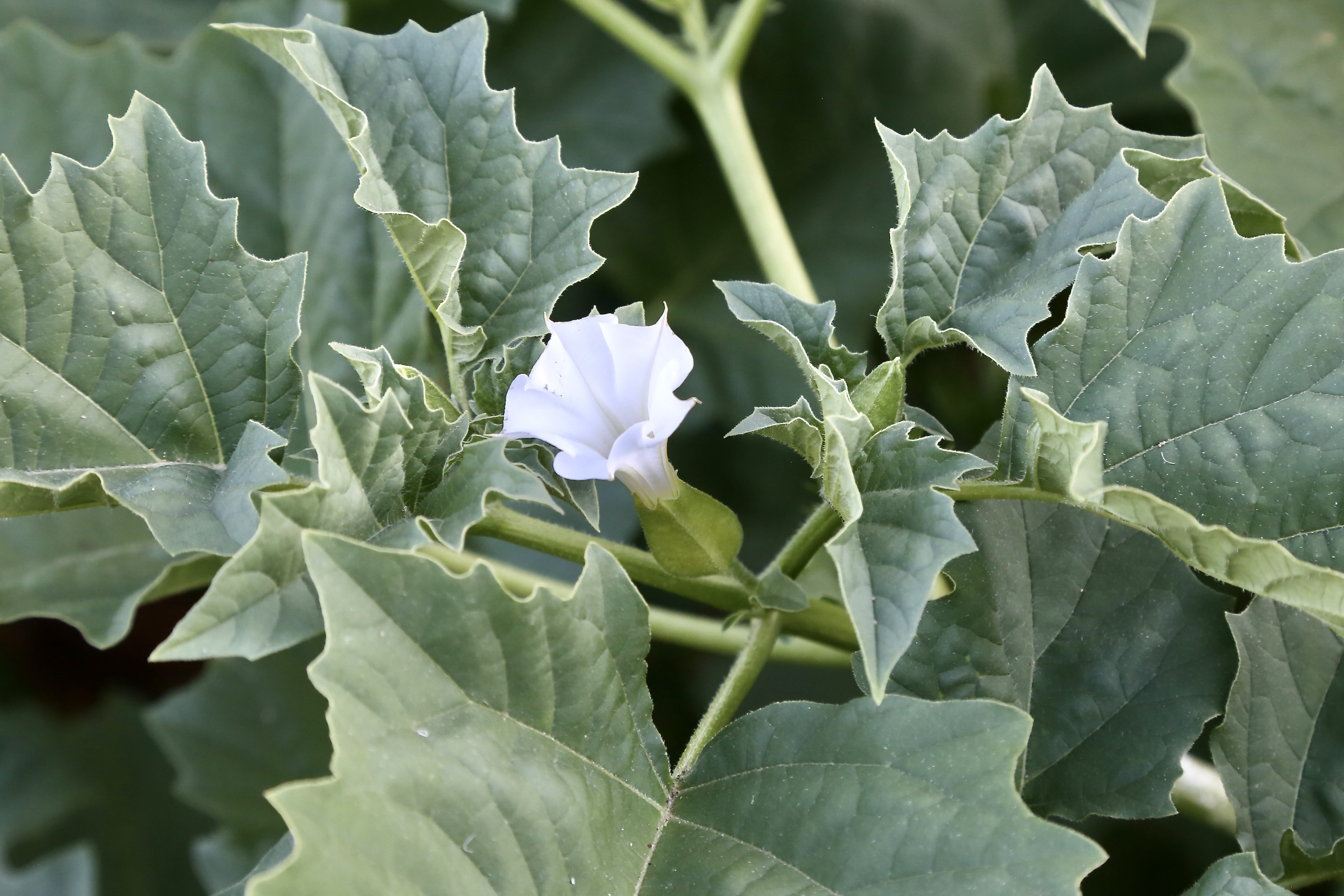

Scientific classification
- Kingdom: Plantae
- Clade: Tracheophytes
- Clade: Angiosperms
- Clade: Eudicots
- Clade: Asterids
- Order: Solanales
- Family: Solanaceae
- Genus: Datura
- Species: D. ferox

Binomial name
- Datura ferox L.

= Datura ferox =

Species of plant

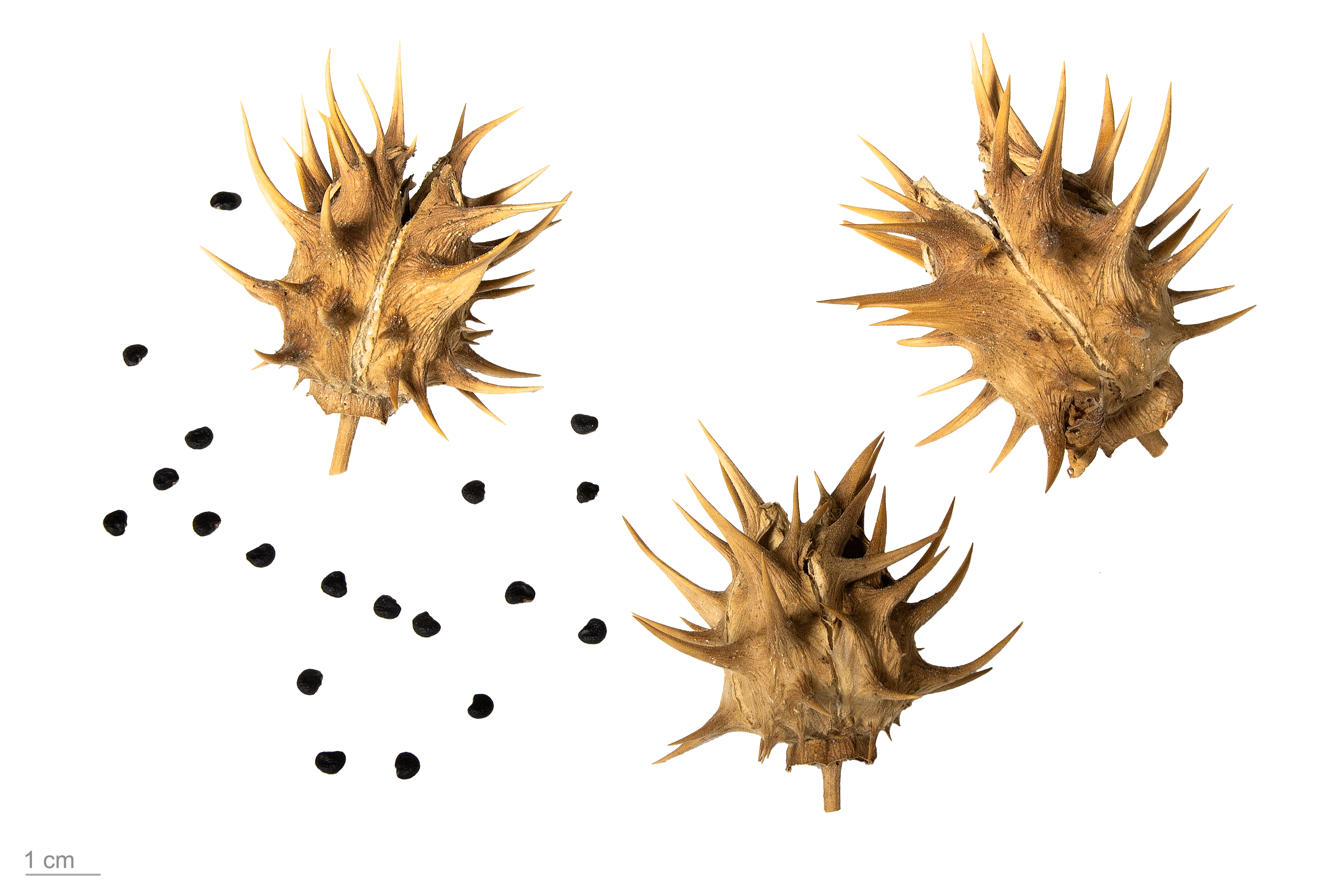
Datura ferox MHNT

Datura ferox, commonly known as long spined thorn apple and fierce thornapple, as well as Angel's-trumpets, is a species of Datura. Like all such species, every part of the plant contains deadly toxins that can kill animals (including humans) that ingest it. Its fruit, red-brown when ripe, has unusually long thorns or spikes.

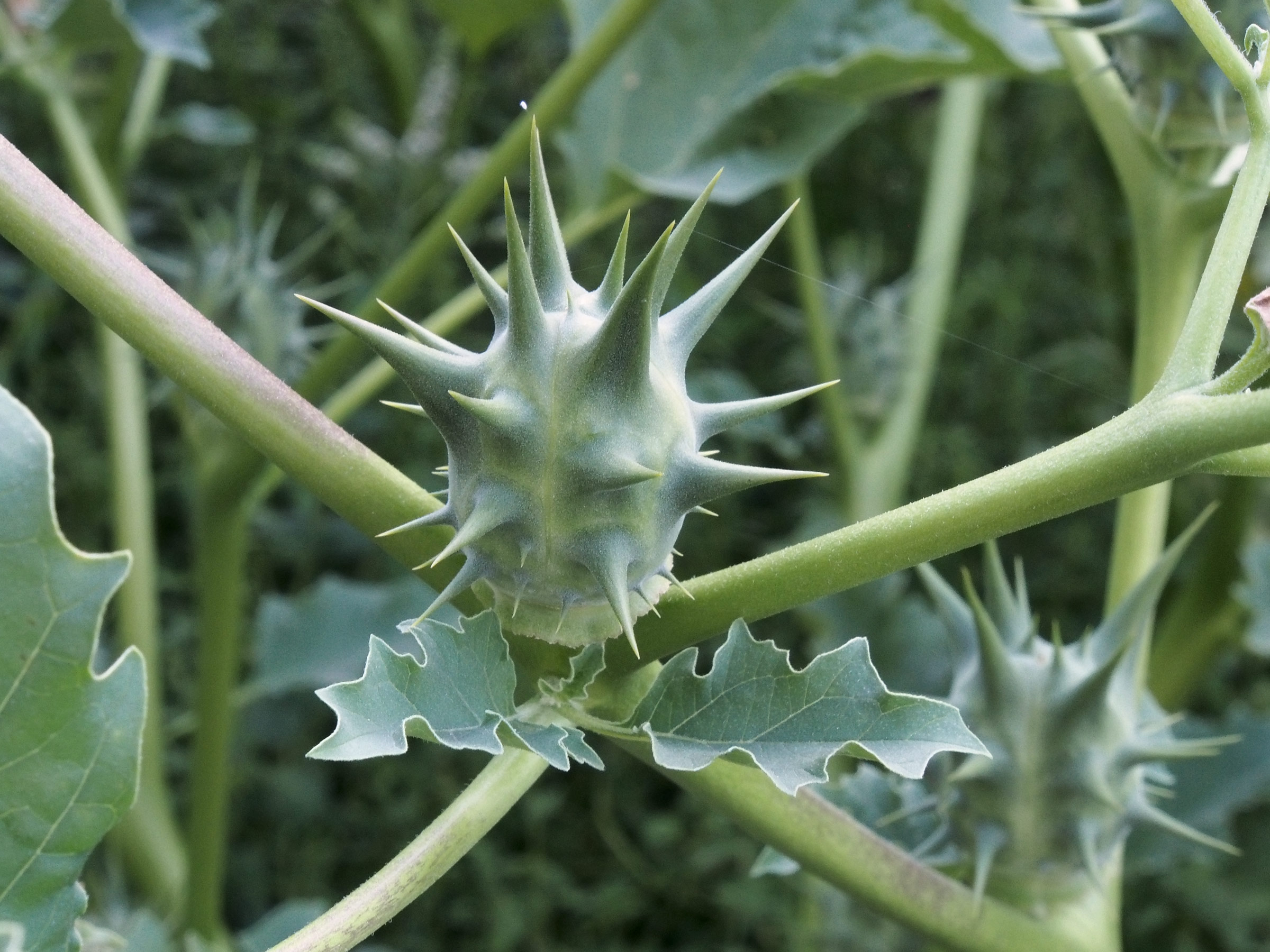
Datura ferox

The species was first described in 1756 by Linnaeus. Ferox means "strongly fortified," referring to the fearsome-looking spines on the seed pod. The species was long thought to have originated in southeastern China, but recent work by Symon and Haegi has demonstrated that, like all other Datura species, it is in fact native to the Americas. The species is very close in morphology to Datura quercifolia, of which it may constitute a subspecies. Today it is found in all the warm parts of the earth, where it is regarded as a dangerous pasture weed.

Datura ferox is a stout, upright annual herb 1.5 to 3 ft (45 to 90 cm) high. Its thick stalks often have a red-violet color at the base. All the young shoots are noticeably hairy. The most conspicuous part of the plant is its very wide, undulate, irregularly toothed leaves, which are covered with soft, downy hairs. The yellowish white flowers are funnel-shaped and inconspicuous, and usually do not open completely.

== Toxicity ==
All parts of Datura plants contain dangerous levels of tropane alkaloids and may be fatal if ingested by humans or other animals, including livestock and pets. In some places it is prohibited to buy, sell or cultivate Datura plants.
