= Dandelion coffee =

Tisane made from dandelion root

Dandelion coffee (also dandelion tea) is a tisane made from the root of the dandelion plant. The roasted dandelion root pieces and the beverage have some resemblance to coffee in appearance and taste, and it is thus commonly considered a coffee substitute.

== History ==
The usage of the dandelion plant dates back to the ancient Egyptians, Greeks and Romans. Additionally, for over a thousand years, Chinese traditional medicine has been known to incorporate the plant.

During the American Civil War, Confederate States Army soldiers would consume dandelion root coffee as an ersatz good.

Susanna Moodie explained how to prepare dandelion 'coffee' in her memoir of living in Canada, Roughing it in the Bush (1852), where she mentions that she had heard of it from an article published in the 1830s in New York Albion by a certain Dr. Harrison. Dandelion 'coffee' was later mentioned in a Harpers New Monthly Magazine story in 1886. In 1919, dandelion root was noted as a source of cheap 'coffee'. It has also been part of edible plant classes dating back at least to the 1970s.

== Harvesting ==
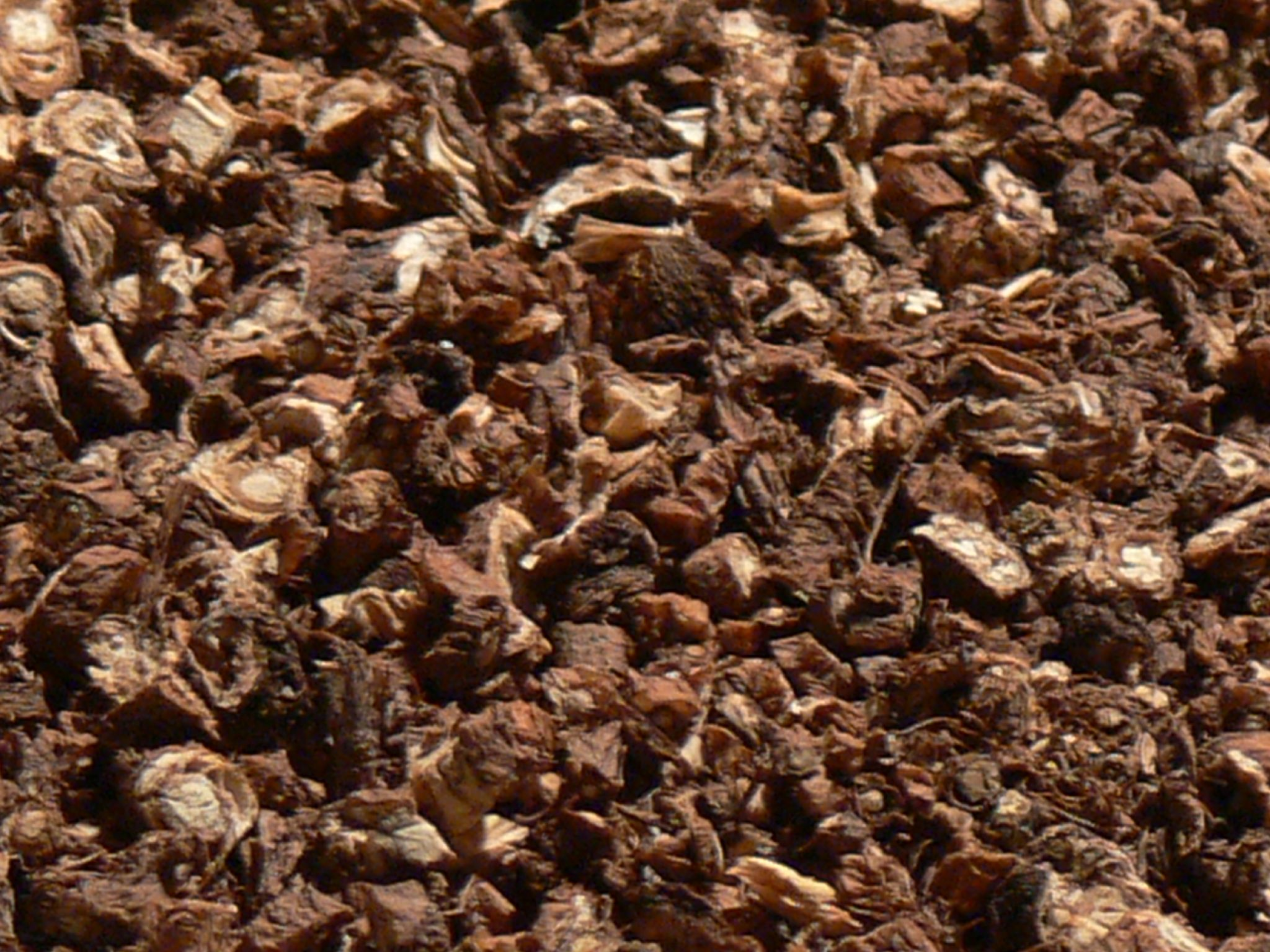
Roasted dandelion root, ready to be used to prepare dandelion coffee

Harvesting dandelion roots requires differentiating 'true' dandelions (Taraxacum spp.) from other yellow daisy-like flowers such as catsear and hawksbeard. True dandelions have a ground-level rosette of deep-toothed leaves and hollow straw-like stems. Large plants that are 3–4 years old, with taproots approximately 0.5 inch (13 mm) in diameter, are harvested for dandelion coffee. These taproots are similar in appearance to pale carrots.

Dandelion roots that are harvested in the spring have sweeter and less bitter notes, while fall-harvested roots are richer and more bitter.

== Preparation ==
The dandelion plant must be two years old before removing the root. After harvesting, the dandelion roots are dried, chopped, and roasted. The roots are sliced lengthwise and placed to dry for two weeks in a warm area. When ready, the dried roots are oven-roasted and stored away. To prepare a cup, one will steep about 1 teaspoon of the root in hot water for around 10 minutes. Alternatively, packaged dandelion root coffee can be purchased. People often enjoy their dandelion coffee with cream and sugar.

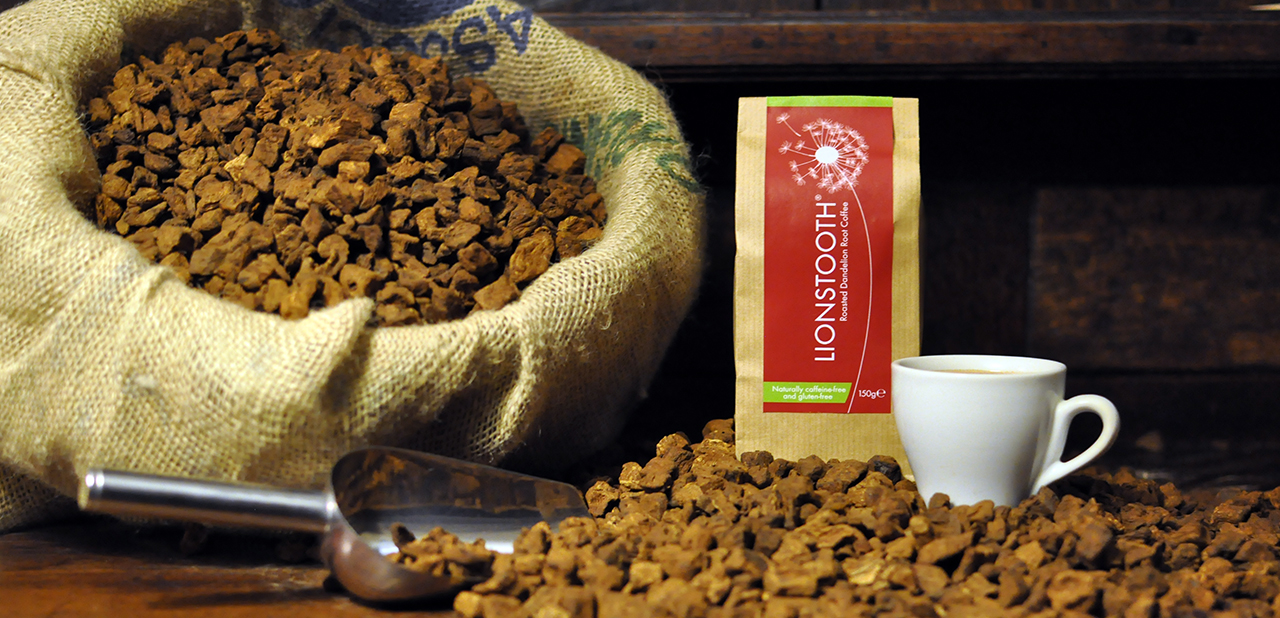
Packaged dandelion root coffee

== Health claims and uses ==
Although popular in alternative health circles and in Chinese medicine and central-eastern European folk medicine, there is no empirical evidence that dandelion root or its extracts can treat any medical condition. In addition, very few high-quality clinical trials have been performed to investigate its effects.

Health risks associated with dandelion root are uncommon; however, directly consuming the plant by mouth could lead to stomach discomfort, heartburn, allergic reactions, or diarrhea.

== Chemistry ==
Unroasted Taraxacum officinale (among other dandelion species) root contains:

Sesquiterpene lactones

- Taraxacin (a guaianolide)
- Phenylpropanoid glycosides: dihydroconiferin, syringin, and dihydrosyringin
- Taraxacoside(an acylated gamma-butyrolactone glycoside)
- Lactupircin

Carotenoids

- Lutein
- Violaxanthin

Coumarins

- Esculin
- Scopoletin

Flavonoids

- Apigenin-7-glucoside
- Luteolin-7-glucoside
- Isorhamnetin 3-glucoside
- Luteolin-7-diglucoside
- Quercetin-7-glucoside
- Quercetin
- Luteolin
- Rutin
- Chrysoeriol

Phenolic acids

- Caffeic acid
- Chlorogenic acid
- Chicoric acid (dicaffeoyltartaric acid)
- ρ-hydroxyphenylacetic acids

Polysaccharides

- Glucans mannans
- inulin (8)

Cyanogenic glycosides

- Prunasin

Sesquiterpene lactones (of the germacranolide type)

- 11β, 13-dihydrolactucin
- Ixerin D
- Ainslioside taraxinic acid
- β-glucopyranosyl
- Taraxinic acid
- Glucosyl ester
- 11-dihydrotaraxinic acid and 13-dihydrotaraxinic acid
- l'-glucoside
- Lactucopicrin
- Lactucin
- Cichorin

Eudesmanolides

- Tetrahydroridentin-B
- Taraxacolide-O-β-glucopyranoside
- Prunasin
- Dihydroconiferin
- Syringin
- Dihydrosyringin
- Taraxasterol
- ψ-taraxasterol
- Homo-taraxasterol
- Stigmatsterol

Triterpenes

- Cycloartenol
- α-amyrin
- β-amyrin
- Arnidiol
- Faradiol
- Lupeol
- Taraxol
- Taraxaserol and
- 3β-hydroxylup-18-ene-21-one

Sterols

- Taraxasterol
- ψ-taraxasterol
- Homo-taraxasterol
- β-sitosterol
- Stigmatsterol
- Campesterol

Other

- Lettucenin A
- Taraxalisin, a serine proteinase
- Amino acids
- Choline
- Mucilage
- Pectin

== See also ==
- Chicory#History
- Camp Coffee
