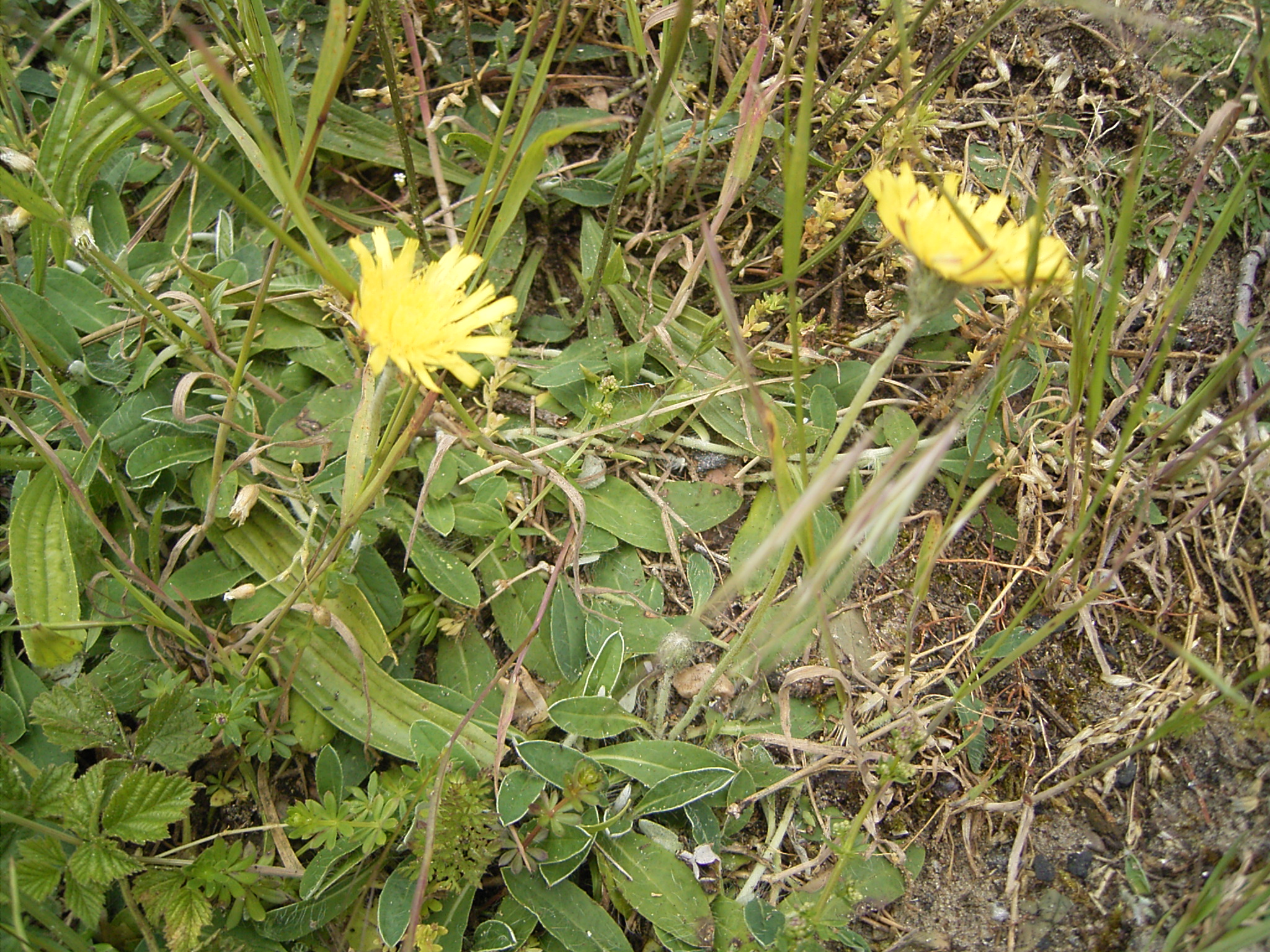

Scientific classification
- Kingdom: Plantae
- Clade: Embryophytes
- Clade: Tracheophytes
- Clade: Angiosperms
- Clade: Eudicots
- Clade: Asterids
- Order: Asterales
- Family: Asteraceae
- Genus: Pilosella
- Species: P. officinarum

Binomial name
- Pilosella officinarum Vaill.

Synonyms
- Hieracium albofloccosum (Nägeli & Peter) Prain; Hieracium kemulariae Üksip; Hieracium leucopsilon Arv.-Touv.; Hieracium melanops (Peter) J.Weiss; Hieracium obscurisquamum (Nägeli & Peter) Prain; Hieracium paradoxum Kem.-Nath.; Hieracium pilosella L.; Hieracium tricholepium (Nägeli & Peter) Prain; Hieracium trichosoma (Peter) J.Weiss; Pilosella angustella Norrl.; Pilosella melanops (Peter) Dostál; Pilosella micradenophora Dostál; Pilosella tricholepia (Nägeli & Peter) Dostál; Pilosella urnigera Norrl.

= Pilosella officinarum =

Species of flowering plant in the daisy family

Pilosella officinarum (synonym Hieracium pilosella), known as mouse-ear hawkweed, is a yellow-flowered species of flowering plant in the daisy family Compositae (= Asteraceae), native to Europe and northern Asia. It produces single, lemon-coloured inflorescences. Like most hawkweed species, it is highly variable and is a member of a species complex of several dozens of subspecies and hundreds of varieties and forms. It is an allelopathic plant.

== Description ==
It is a hispid (hairy) perennial plant, with a basal rosette of leaves. The whole plant, with the exception of the flower parts, is covered in glandular hairs, usually whitish, sometimes reddish on the stem. The rosette leaves are entire, acute to blunt, and range from 1–12 centimetres (0.39–4.72 in) long and 0.5–2 centimetres (0.20–0.79 in) broad. Their underside is tomentose (covered with hair). The flowering stem (scape) is generally between 5–50 centimetres (2.0–19.7 in) tall, and sprouts from the centre of the basal rosette. The flowerheads are borne singly on the scape and are a pale lemon-yellow colour, with the outermost ligules having a reddish underside. It flowers from May until August and the flowers are visited by various groups of insects, especially flies.

The plant favours dry, sunny areas. It grows well on sandy and similarly less fertile ground types. It produces stolons which generate a new rosette at their extremity, each rosette has the possibility of developing into a new clone forming dense mats in open space. It also propagates by seeds.

== Ecology ==
It is a known allelopathic plant, whose roots secrete several substances inhibiting root growth, including its own. It can be controlled through rotation with clover and grasses where possible.

Recent research claims that Pilosella officinarum exhibits an atavism by the reemergence of sexual reproduction.

The plant has been found as an invasive species in Sphagnum peatlands disturbed by peat extraction in southern Patagonia.

== Similar species ==
Shetland mouse-ear hawkweed (Pilosella flagellaris subsp. bicapitata) is similar, but has two flowers per leaf stalk. It is found in the Shetland Islands only, on rocky coastal grassland. It flowers from May to August.

== Cultivation and uses ==
Mouse-ear hawkweed has become a common introduced invasive species in North America (where it is found in southern Canada and both north-east and north-west United States), and New Zealand. It is a level C noxious weed in the United States (with higher levels in the states of Washington and Oregon), and a weed in Quebec. It does not have special designations in other locations in Canada. It is known to be strongly invasive in New Zealand's tussock fields, where there are no native species of hawkweed, and biological control measures are being undertaken to control it and other similar species. In Victoria and NSW, Australia, Hawkweed Sp. are declared as State Prohibited Weeds and are controlled under The Bio Security Act 2015. Currently there are several eradication programs operating (often employing volunteers) to locate, prevent the spread of and eradicate any Pilosella (Hieracium) sp. plants.

Joseph Pitton de Tournefort mentions that blades covered in this plant's juices were believed to cut through stone as easily as through wood.

=== Phytochemistry ===
The mouse-ear hawkweed contains umbelliferone, a compound similar to coumarin. The plant produces triterpenoids, mainly taraxasterol, but also the 4,4-dimethyl phytosterols alpha- and beta-amyrin, taraxerol, and fern-7en-3beta-ol. It has been used in folk medicine, and recreationally as a cannabis substitute.

== Image gallery ==
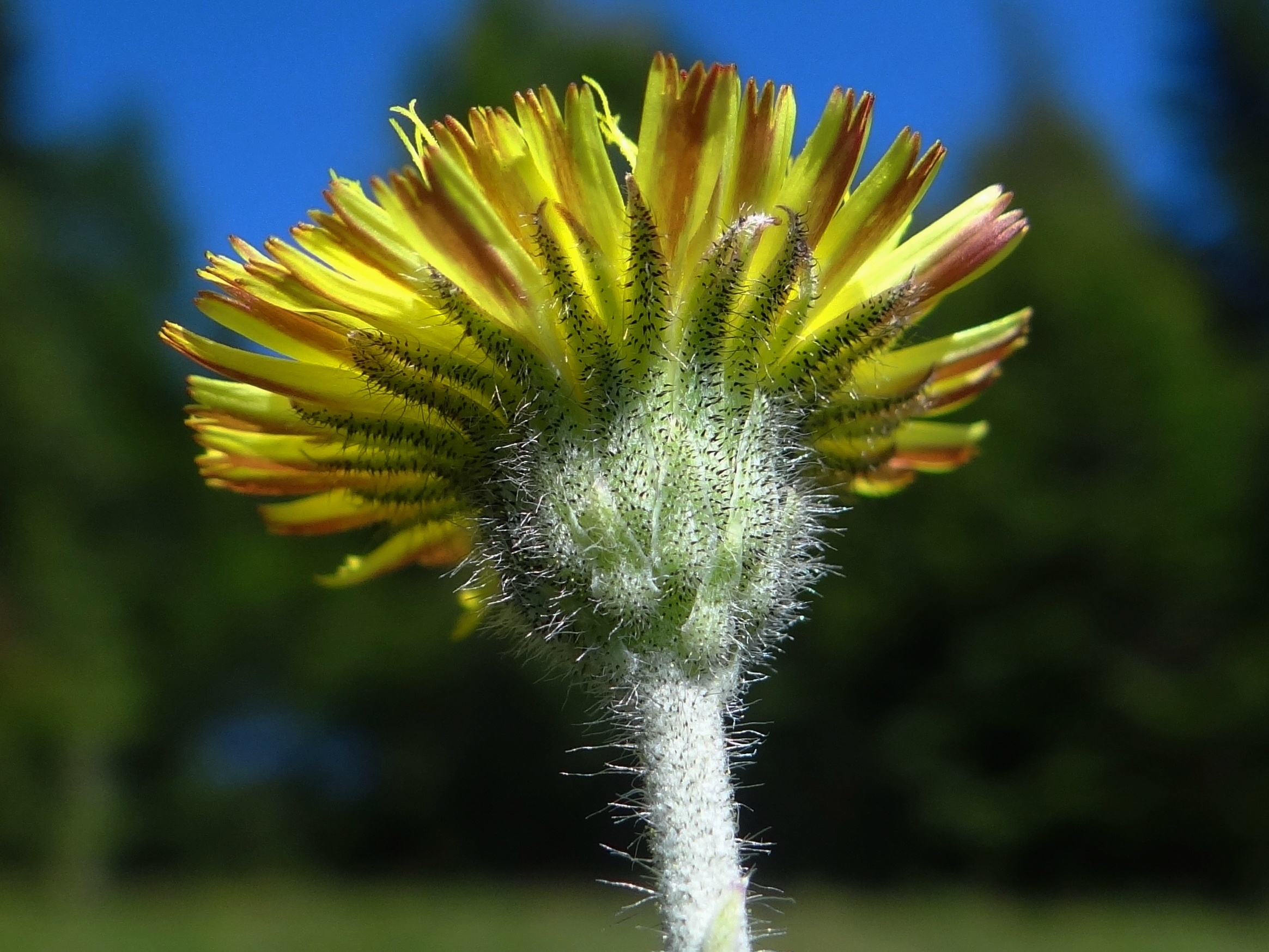

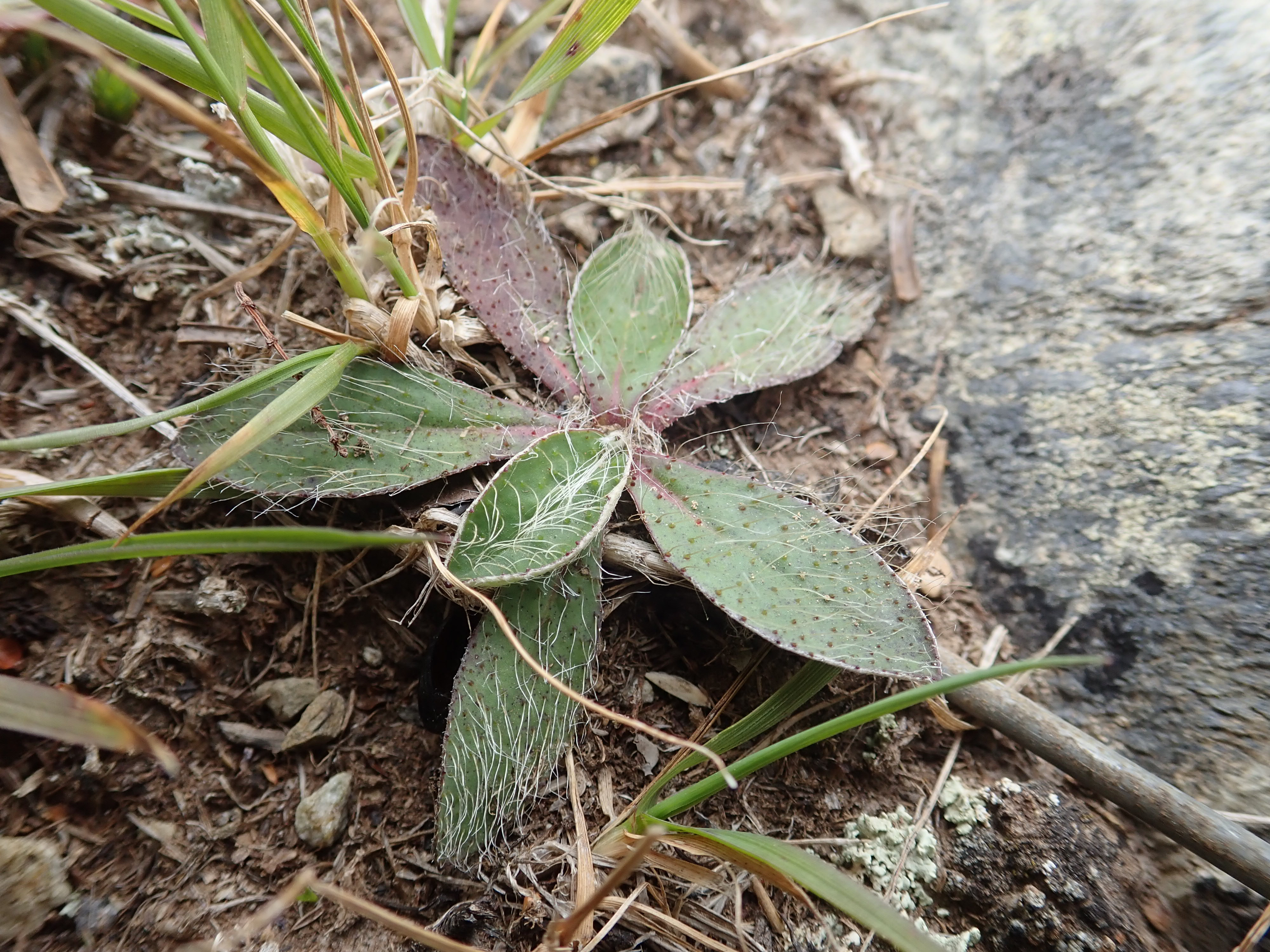
