= C30H50O2 =

The molecular formula C_{30}H_{50}O_{2} (molar mass: 442.71 g/mol, exact mass: 442.3811 u) may refer to:

- Arnidiol
- Betulin
- Daturadiol
- Inotodiol
- Serratenediol
