= Daturaolone =

Names
- Preferred IUPAC name (4aR,5R,6aR,6bS,8aR,12aR,14aR,14bR)-5-Hydroxy-4,4,6a,6b,8a,14b-hexamethyl-1,4,4a,5,6,6a,6b,7,8,8a,9,10,11,12,12a,14,14a,14b-octadecahydropicen-3(2H)-one

Identifiers
CAS Number	41498-80-0
3D model (JSmol)	Interactive image
ChEMBL	ChEMBL2005473
ChemSpider	109521
PubChem CID	122859
CompTox Dashboard (EPA)	DTXSID70961770
- InChI: InChI=1S/C30H48O2/c1-25(2)13-14-27(5)15-16-29(7)19(20(27)17-25)9-10-22-28(6)12-11-23(32)26(3,4)24(28)21(31)18-30(22,29)8/h9,20-22,24,31H,10-18H2,1-8H3/t20-,21+,22+,24-,27+,28+,29+,30+/m0/s1 Key: YCTXVPCDHZMBHX-QCDSSADQSA-N
- SMILES: CC1(CCC2(CCC3(C(=CCC4C3(CC(C5C4(CCC(=O)C5(C)C)C)O)C)C2C1)C)C)C

Properties
Chemical formula	C_{30}H_{48}O_{2}
Molar mass	440.712 g·mol^{−1}
- Except where otherwise noted, data are given for materials in their standard state (at 25 °C [77 °F], 100 kPa). Infobox references

Daturaolone is a pentacyclic oleanane triterpenoid, also known as 3-oxo-6-β-hydroxy-β-amyrin, found in Datura species such as Datura stramonium and Datura innoxia.

== History ==
It was isolated for the first time from Solanum arundo.

== Structure ==
Daturaolone contains five rings with a ketone group and a hydroxyl group, which may be essential for its bioactivities. The structure was deduced through mass spectroscopy and ^{1}H NMR spectroscopy.

== Functions ==
Daturaolone isolated from Datura metel Linnaeus has been found to have anti-fungal and anti-bacterial activities. When tested against bacterial strains such as Klebsiella pneumoniae and S. aureus, daturaolone was shown to inhibit bacterial growth.

== See also ==
- Scopine
- Daturadiol
- Withametelin
