= Eleutheroside =

Group of chemical compounds

Eleutherosides are a diverse group of chemical compounds that were isolated from roots of the herb Eleutherococcus senticosus which is commercially offered mostly as extracts. Eleutheroside A is a saponin and sterol glycoside while other eleutherosides, such as eleutheroside B (syringin), are phenyl propanoid glycosides. They serve as marker compounds for the Thin layer chromatography identification of Eleutherococcus senticosus herbal preparations and dietary supplements.

Eleutheroside E is an optical isomer of acanthoside D, which is one of the glycosides isolated from the cluster-flowering acanthopanax and represents the di-β-D-glucoside of (−)-syringaresinol.

Eleutheroside A
(daucosterol)

Eleutheroside B
(syringin)

Eleutheroside C
(ethyl galactoside)

Eleutheroside D

Eleutheroside E [39432-56-9]

Eleutheroside E appears to be a glycoside of syringaresinol.
