= Isofraxidin =

Names
- Preferred IUPAC name 7-Hydroxy-6,8-dimethoxy-2H-1-benzopyran-2-one
- Other names 6,8-Dimethoxyumbelliferone; 7-Hydroxy-6,8-dimethoxychromen-2-one; 7-Hydroxy-6,8-dimethoxycoumarin

Identifiers
CAS Number	486-21-5
3D model (JSmol)	Interactive image
ChemSpider	4477107
PubChem CID	5318565
UNII	304915F056
CompTox Dashboard (EPA)	DTXSID70197557
- InChI: InChI=1S/C11H10O5/c1-14-7-5-6-3-4-8(12)16-10(6)11(15-2)9(7)13/h3-5,13H,1-2H3 Key: HOEVRHHMDJKUMZ-UHFFFAOYSA-N; InChI=1/C11H10O5/c1-14-7-5-6-3-4-8(12)16-10(6)11(15-2)9(7)13/h3-5,13H,1-2H3 Key: HOEVRHHMDJKUMZ-UHFFFAOYAN
- SMILES: O=C/2Oc1c(OC)c(O)c(OC)cc1\C=C\2

Properties
Chemical formula	C_{11}H_{10}O_{5}
Molar mass	222.196 g·mol^{−1}
- Except where otherwise noted, data are given for materials in their standard state (at 25 °C [77 °F], 100 kPa). Infobox references

Isofraxidin is a chemical compound found in a variety of plants including Eleutherococcus senticosus.

== See also ==
- Isofraxidin-7-glucoside
