= Taraxerol synthase =

Identifiers
- EC no.: 5.4.99.35

Databases
- IntEnz: IntEnz view
- BRENDA: BRENDA entry
- ExPASy: NiceZyme view
- KEGG: KEGG entry
- MetaCyc: metabolic pathway
- PRIAM: profile
- PDB structures: RCSB PDB PDBe PDBsum
Search
- PMC: articles
- PubMed: articles
- NCBI: proteins

Taraxerol synthase (EC 5.4.99.35, RsM2, (S)-2,3-epoxysqualene mutase (cyclizing, taraxerol-forming)) is an enzyme with systematic name (3S)-2,3-epoxy-2,3-dihydrosqualene mutase (cyclizing, taraxerol-forming). This enzyme catalyses the following chemical reaction

(3S)-2,3-epoxy-2,3-dihydrosqualene $\rightleftharpoons$ taraxerol

The enzyme gives taraxerol, beta-amyrin and lupeol.
