= Beta-amyrin 24-hydroxylase =

Identifiers
- EC no.: 1.14.99.43

Databases
- IntEnz: IntEnz view
- BRENDA: BRENDA entry
- ExPASy: NiceZyme view
- KEGG: KEGG entry
- MetaCyc: metabolic pathway
- PRIAM: profile
- PDB structures: RCSB PDB PDBe PDBsum
Search
- PMC: articles
- PubMed: articles
- NCBI: proteins

Beta-amyrin 24-hydroxylase (EC 1.14.99.43, sophoradiol 24-hydroxylase, CYP93E1) is an enzyme with systematic name beta-amyrin,AH2:oxygen oxidoreductase (24-hydroxylating). This enzyme catalyses the following chemical reaction

(1) beta-amyrin + AH_{2} + O_{2} $\rightleftharpoons$ 24-hydroxy-beta-amyrin + A + H_{2}O
(2) sophoradiol + AH_{2} + O_{2} $\rightleftharpoons$ 24-hydroxysophoradiol + A + H_{2}O

Beta-amyrin 24-hydroxylase is heme-thiolate protein (P-450).
