= Beta-amyrin 11-oxidase =

Class of enzymes

Identifiers
- EC no.: 1.14.13.134

Databases
- IntEnz: IntEnz view
- BRENDA: BRENDA entry
- ExPASy: NiceZyme view
- KEGG: KEGG entry
- MetaCyc: metabolic pathway
- PRIAM: profile
- PDB structures: RCSB PDB PDBe PDBsum
Search
- PMC: articles
- PubMed: articles
- NCBI: proteins

Beta-amyrin 11-oxidase (EC 1.14.13.134, CYP88D6) is an enzyme with systematic name beta-amyrin,NADPH:oxygen oxidoreductase (hydroxylating). This enzyme catalyses the following chemical reaction

beta-amyrin + 2 O_{2} + 2 NADPH + 2 H^{+} $\rightleftharpoons$ 11-oxo-beta-amyrin + 3 H_{2}O + 2 NADP^{+} (overall reaction)
(1a) beta-amyrin + O_{2} + NADPH + H^{+} $\rightleftharpoons$ 11alpha-hydroxy-beta-amyrin + H_{2}O + NADP^{+}
(1b) 11alpha-hydroxy-beta-amyrin + O_{2} + NADPH + H^{+} $\rightleftharpoons$ 11-oxo-beta-amyrin + 2 H_{2}O + NADP^{+}
