= Israel Brekhman =

Russian pharmacologist

Israel Itskovich Brekhman
- Born: November 20, 1921
- Died: July 9, 1994 (aged 72)
- Known for: Adaptogen research, Panax Ginseng, Siberian ginseng
- Awards: Order of Lenin
- Scientific career
- Fields: Pharmacology

Israel Itskovich Brekhman (20 November 1921 – 9 July 1994) was a Russian pharmacologist. He specialized in adaptogens, with a focus on Panax Ginseng and especially Siberian ginseng. Brekhman was highly awarded by both the Soviet Union and later by the Russian Federation for his research. He was a recipient of Order of Lenin.
