= Eleutheroside D =

Names
- IUPAC name (2R,3R,4S,5S,6R)-2-[4-[6-[3,5-dimethoxy-4-[(2R,3R,4S,5S,6R)-3,4,5-trihydroxy-6-(hydroxymethyl)oxan-2-yl]oxyphenyl]-1,3,3a,4,6,6a-hexahydrofuro[3,4-c]furan-3-yl]-2,6-dimethoxyphenoxy]-6-(hydroxymethyl)oxane-3,4,5-triol

Identifiers
CAS Number	79484-75-6
3D model (JSmol)	Interactive image
ChemSpider	24534177
PubChem CID	71307453
UNII	WVS8LR64R4
CompTox Dashboard (EPA)	DTXSID001030486
- InChI: InChI=1S/C34H46O18/c1-43-17-5-13(6-18(44-2)31(17)51-33-27(41)25(39)23(37)21(9-35)49-33)29-15-11-48-30(16(15)12-47-29)14-7-19(45-3)32(20(8-14)46-4)52-34-28(42)26(40)24(38)22(10-36)50-34/h5-8,15-16,21-30,33-42H,9-12H2,1-4H3/t15-,16+,21-,22-,23-,24-,25+,26+,27-,28-,29-,30-,33+,34+/m1/s1 Key: FFDULTAFAQRACT-LHJOJEKWSA-N; InChI=1/C34H46O18/c1-43-17-5-13(6-18(44-2)31(17)51-33-27(41)25(39)23(37)21(9-35)49-33)29-15-11-48-30(16(15)12-47-29)14-7-19(45-3)32(20(8-14)46-4)52-34-28(42)26(40)24(38)22(10-36)50-34/h5-8,15-16,21-30,33-42H,9-12H2,1-4H3/t15-,16+,21-,22-,23-,24-,25+,26+,27-,28-,29-,30-,33+,34+/m1/s1 Key: FFDULTAFAQRACT-LHJOJEKWBK
- SMILES: COc1cc(cc(c1O[C@H]2[C@@H]([C@H]([C@@H]([C@H](O2)CO)O)O)O)OC)[C@@H]3[C@@H]4CO[C@@H]([C@H]4CO3)c5cc(c(c(c5)OC)O[C@H]6[C@@H]([C@H]([C@@H]([C@H](O6)CO)O)O)O)OC

Properties
Chemical formula	C_{34}H_{46}O_{18}
Molar mass	742.72 g/mol
- Except where otherwise noted, data are given for materials in their standard state (at 25 °C [77 °F], 100 kPa). Infobox references

Eleutheroside D is an eleutheroside. An eleutheroside is a compound found in Eleutherococcus senticosus, the Siberian ginseng. Chemically, it is a dimer of sinapyl alcohol glucoside, and is an optical isomer of Eleutheroside E. Eleutheroside D and E are thought to be the most pharmacologically active out of the eleutherosides.
