= Isofraxidin-7-glucoside =

Names
- IUPAC name 7-(β-D-Glucopyranosyloxy)-6,8-dimethoxy-2H-1-benzopyran-2-one
- Systematic IUPAC name 6,8-Dimethoxy-7-{[(2S,3R,4S,5S,6R)-3,4,5-trihydroxy-6-(hydroxymethyl)oxan-2-yl]oxy}-2H-1-benzopyran-2-one
- Other names Calycanthoside; Isofraxidin 7-O-beta-D-glucoside

Identifiers
CAS Number	483-91-0
3D model (JSmol)	Interactive image
ChemSpider	4477108
PubChem CID	5318566
UNII	X9UV2YMM9C
CompTox Dashboard (EPA)	DTXSID001031715
- InChI: InChI=1S/C17H20O10/c1-23-8-5-7-3-4-10(19)26-14(7)16(24-2)15(8)27-17-13(22)12(21)11(20)9(6-18)25-17/h3-5,9,11-13,17-18,20-22H,6H2,1-2H3/t9-,11-,12+,13-,17+/m1/s1 Key: IKUQEFGEUOOPGY-QSDFBURQSA-N; InChI=1/C17H20O10/c1-23-8-5-7-3-4-10(19)26-14(7)16(24-2)15(8)27-17-13(22)12(21)11(20)9(6-18)25-17/h3-5,9,11-13,17-18,20-22H,6H2,1-2H3/t9-,11-,12+,13-,17+/m1/s1 Key: IKUQEFGEUOOPGY-QSDFBURQBK
- SMILES: O=C/2Oc3c(OC)c(O[C@@H]1O[C@@H]([C@@H](O)[C@H](O)[C@H]1O)CO)c(OC)cc3\C=C\2

Properties
Chemical formula	C_{17}H_{20}O_{10}
Molar mass	384.337 g·mol^{−1}
- Except where otherwise noted, data are given for materials in their standard state (at 25 °C [77 °F], 100 kPa). Infobox references

Isofraxidin-7-glucoside (calycanthoside) is a constituent of Eleutherococcus senticosus that is classified as a coumarin. It is a glucoside of isofraxidin.
