= Syringin =

Names
- IUPAC name 4-[(1E)-3-Hydroxyprop-1-en-1-yl]-2,6-dimethoxyphenyl β-D-glucopyranoside
- Systematic IUPAC name (2R,3S,4S,5R,6S)-2-(Hydroxymethyl)-6-{4-[(1E)-3-hydroxyprop-1-en-1-yl]-2,6-dimethoxyphenoxy}oxane-3,4,5-triol
- Other names Eleutheroside B; Ilexanthin A; Ligustrin; Lilacin; Magnolenin; Methoxyconiferine; Sinapyl alcohol 4-O-glucoside; Siringin; Syringoside

Identifiers
CAS Number	118-34-3
3D model (JSmol)	Interactive image
ChEBI	CHEBI:9380
ChEMBL	ChEMBL250872
ChemSpider	4475831
ECHA InfoCard	100.120.487
EC Number	601-519-0
KEGG	C01533
PubChem CID	5316860
UNII	I6F5B11C96
CompTox Dashboard (EPA)	DTXSID2042438
- InChI: InChI=1S/C17H24O9/c1-23-10-6-9(4-3-5-18)7-11(24-2)16(10)26-17-15(22)14(21)13(20)12(8-19)25-17/h3-4,6-7,12-15,17-22H,5,8H2,1-2H3/b4-3+/t12-,13-,14+,15-,17+/m1/s1 Key: QJVXKWHHAMZTBY-GCPOEHJPSA-N; InChI=1/C17H24O9/c1-23-10-6-9(4-3-5-18)7-11(24-2)16(10)26-17-15(22)14(21)13(20)12(8-19)25-17/h3-4,6-7,12-15,17-22H,5,8H2,1-2H3/b4-3+/t12-,13-,14+,15-,17+/m1/s1 Key: QJVXKWHHAMZTBY-GCPOEHJPBY
- SMILES: O(c1c(OC)cc(/C=C/CO)cc1OC)[C@@H]2O[C@@H]([C@@H](O)[C@H](O)[C@H]2O)CO

Properties
Chemical formula	C_{17}H_{24}O_{9}
Molar mass	372.370 g·mol^{−1}
Appearance	White crystalline solid
Melting point	192 °C (378 °F; 465 K)
Solubility in water	Slightly soluble
- Except where otherwise noted, data are given for materials in their standard state (at 25 °C [77 °F], 100 kPa). Infobox references

Syringin is a natural chemical compound first isolated from the bark of lilac (Syringa vulgaris) by Meillet in 1841. It has since been found to be distributed widely throughout many types of plants. It is also called eleutheroside B, and is found in Eleutherococcus senticosus (Siberian ginseng). It is also found in dandelion coffee. Syringin may potentially have antidiabetic effects.

Chemically, it is the glucoside of sinapyl alcohol.
