= Taraxerol =

Names
- IUPAC name 13-Methyl-27-nor-13α-olean-14-en-3β-ol
- Systematic IUPAC name (3S,4aR,6aR,8aR,12aR,12bS,14aR,14bR)-4,4,6a,8a,11,11,12b,14b-Octamethyl-1,2,3,4,4a,5,6,6a,8,8a,9,10,11,12,12a,12b,13,14,14a,14b-icosahydropicen-3-ol
- Other names: Alnulin; Skimmiol

Identifiers
CAS Number	127-22-0
3D model (JSmol)	Interactive image
ChemSpider	83146
PubChem CID	92097
UNII	A32778O852
CompTox Dashboard (EPA)	DTXSID001026552
- InChI: InChI=1S/C30H50O/c1-25(2)17-18-27(5)13-9-21-29(7)14-10-20-26(3,4)24(31)12-16-28(20,6)22(29)11-15-30(21,8)23(27)19-25/h9,20,22-24,31H,10-19H2,1-8H3/t20-,22+,23+,24-,27-,28-,29-,30+/m0/s1 Key: GGGUGZHBAOMSFJ-GADYQYKKSA-N; InChI=1/C30H50O/c1-25(2)17-18-27(5)13-9-21-29(7)14-10-20-26(3,4)24(31)12-16-28(20,6)22(29)11-15-30(21,8)23(27)19-25/h9,20,22-24,31H,10-19H2,1-8H3/t20-,22+,23+,24-,27-,28-,29-,30+/m0/s1 Key: GGGUGZHBAOMSFJ-GADYQYKKBI
- SMILES: C[C@]12CCC(C[C@H]1C3(CC[C@@H]4[C@]5(CC[C@@H](C([C@@H]5CC[C@]4(C3=CC2)C)(C)C)O)C)C)(C)C

Properties
Chemical formula	C_{30}H_{50}O
Molar mass	426.729 g·mol^{−1}
Appearance	Colorless solid
- Except where otherwise noted, data are given for materials in their standard state (at 25 °C [77 °F], 100 kPa). Infobox references

Taraxerol is a naturally occurring pentacyclic triterpenoid. It exists in various higher plants, including Taraxacum officinale (Asteraceae), Alnus glutinosa (Betulaceae), Litsea dealbata (Lauraceae), Skimmia spp. (Rutaceae), Dorstenia spp. (Moraceae), Maytenus spp. (Celastraceae), and Alchornea latifolia (Euphobiaceae). Taraxerol was named "alnulin" when it was first isolated in 1923 from the bark of the grey alder (Alnus incana L.) by Zellner and Röglsperger. It also had the name "skimmiol" when Takeda and Yosiki isolated it from Skimmia (Rutaceae). A large number of medicinal plants are known to have this compound in their leaves, roots or seed oil.

== Chemistry ==
=== Structure ===
Taraxerol is an oleanan-3-ol with an alpha-methyl substituent at position 13, a missing methyl group at position 14, and a double bond between 14 and 15. The dominant biological stereoisomer in plant leaves and in sediments has the taraxer-14-en-3β-ol configuration. Taraxerol is a double-bond isomer of β-amyrin, another important naturally occurring triterpenoid in higher plants. It is a colorless solid under room temperature with an estimated melting point of 283.50 °C and boiling point of 490.70 °C. It is practically insoluble in water and has a solubility of 9.552 × 10^{−5} mg/L estimated from octanol-water partition coefficient.

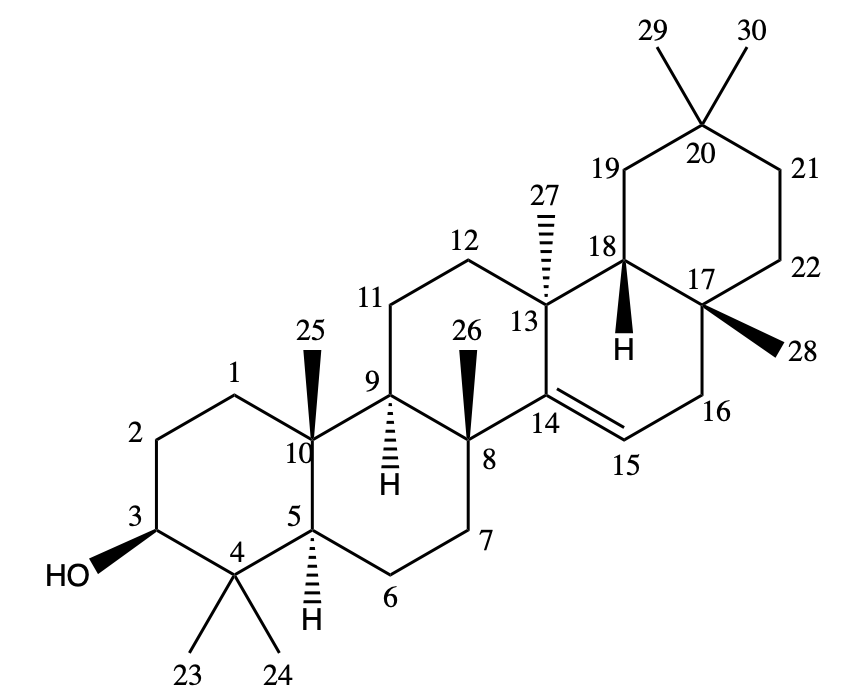
Taraxerol carbon numbering.

=== Synthesis ===
While syntheses of pentacyclic triterpenoids in general have been proven challenging, partial synthesis of 11,12-α-oxidotaraxerol, an epoxide taraxerene derivative, has been reported by Ursprung et al. from α- and β-amyrin. Exposing an ethanolic solution of α- and β-amyrin in summer sunlight for 12 weeks yields a colorless precipitate, and saponification of the precipitate gives 11,12-α-oxidotaraxerol. Alternatively, the process could be accelerated by exposing ethanolic β-amyrin solution under ultraviolet light. In this case, the precipitate can be collected in less than 3 weeks.

=== Transformation in sediment ===
During early diagenesis, taraxerol loses its hydroxyl group and gets transformed to taraxer-14-ene. Taraxer-14-ene can undergo rapid isomerization to form 18β-olean-12-ene, in which the double bond can migrate and form a mixture of olean-12-ene, olean-13(18)-ene, and olean-18-ene. The oleanene isomers form rapidly from taraxerol rearrangements during diagenesis even under cool geothermal conditions. Further reduction during catagenesis of the three compounds gives predominantly 18α-oleanane and its counterpart 18β-oleanane as a minor product. The direct reduction product of taraxerol, taraxerane, is hardly present in natural sediments. Oleanane seems to be the dominant product as a result of the transformation process.

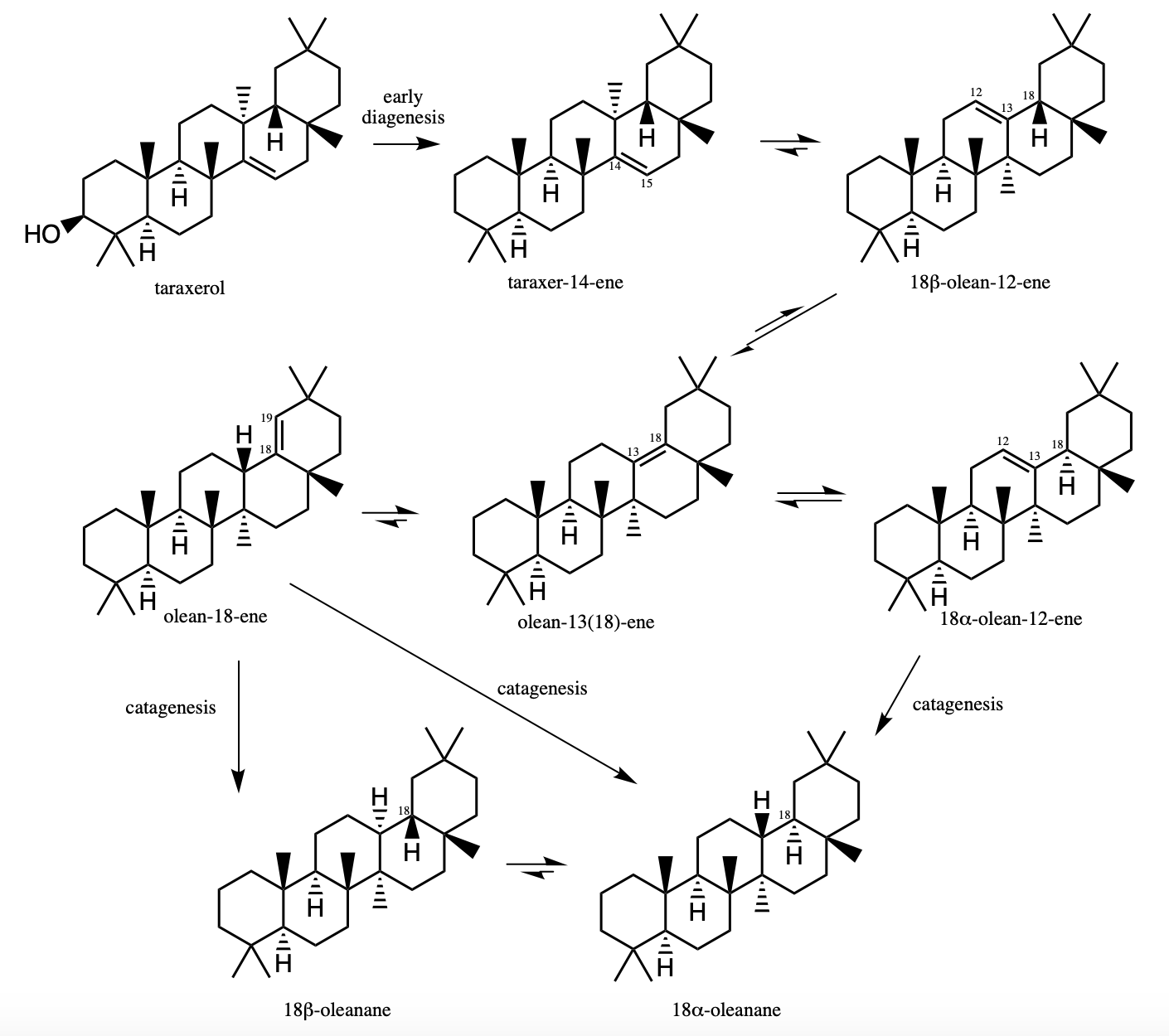
Transformation of taraxerol during diagenesis and catagenesis. Adapted from Killops & Killops (2013).

== Biomarker ==
Taraxerol is usually present in minor amounts in plant extracts, and it can be used as a lipid biomarker for land plants. However, in many species of mangrove tree leaves, e.g. Rhizophora mangle (red mangrove) and Rhizophora racemosa, taraxerol is present in very high levels. Therefore, it is used in various studies as a proxy for mangrove input. Within different mangrove species there also exist compositional differences. For example, Rhizophora mangle contains high levels of taraxerol, β-amyrin, germanicol, and lupeol, Avicennia germinans (black mangrove) consists mainly of lupeol, betulin, and β-sitosterol, and Laguncularia racemosa (white mangrove) is marked by large quantities of lupeol and β-sitosterol.

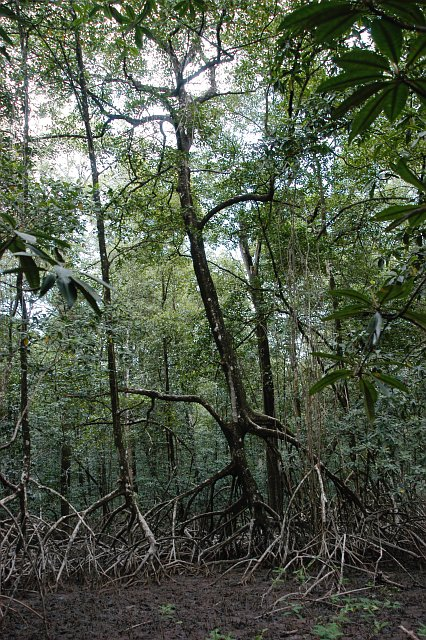
Rhizophora racemosa trees.

=== Mangrove biomarker case study ===
Rhizophora racemosa represents the dominant mangrove species in equatorial and sub-equatorial west Africa. Versteegh et al. analyzed the leaf lipids of R. racemosa as well as surface sediments and sediment cores from Angola Basin and Cape Basin (southeast Atlantic) to assess the suitability of using taraxerol as a proxy for mangrove input in marine sediments. The hypothesis is that there should be a "base-level" for taraxerol in general sediments and elevated levels at places where Rhizophora has significant contribution.

Analysis suggests that taraxerol dominates the inside and the total composition of R. racemosa leaves (7.7 mg/g leaf). As a result, increase in taraxerol level relative to other higher plant biomarkers in sediments should indicate when and where Rhizophora contributes substantially. In the most part of SE Atlantic, taraxerol/normal C_{29} alkanes (n-C_{29}) ratio in surface sediments is low. High ratios are observed in a zone along the continental slope, in which maxima always occur near present-day on shore mangrove trees. This pattern strongly corroborates the link between high levels of taraxerol and input from mangrove ecosystems. This link is also supported by a similar, though less prominent, trend in Rhizophora pollens.

Examination of the sediment cores reveals further connections between mangrove population, taraxerol levels, and climate conditions. One important climate condition is glaciation/deglaciation. During deglaciations when rates of sea level rise exceeded 12 cm/100 yr, mangrove populations could not persist due to lack of sediment supply. After this rate slowed down, mangrove populations can expand again in the freshly developed estuaries and deltas. Periods of mangrove development and rise in taraxerol levels in the basin, however, sometimes do not coincide with each other. In times of fast sea-level rise, coastal mangrove deposits can be transported to the basin, resulting in an increase in taraxerol input, while mangrove development would actually happen afterward. In some other cases where fluctuation in taraxerol levels was not related to sea-level changes, it can also be attributed to local climate variations in temperature and humidity.

== Analysis methods ==
Analysis methods for the determination and quantification of taraxerol include gas chromatography/mass spectroscopy (GC/MS) and high-performance thin layer chromatography (HPTLC).

=== GC/MS ===
There are several treatment procedures before running leaf or sediment samples containing taraxerol through GC/MS analysis. Dried and grinded samples are saponified with strong base (e.g. potassium hydroxide), extracted in polar solvent (e.g. dichloromethane), separated into fractions by column chromatography, and finally derivatized. Common choices for derivatization include N-methyl-N-(trimethylsilyl)trifluoroacetamide (MSTFA) and mixture of pyridine and bis(trimethylsilyl)trifluoroacetamide (BSTFA), both of which aim to convert the free hydroxyl groups to trimethylsilyl ethers, making the molecules more non-polar and thus more suitable for GC/MS analysis. In GC/MS, taraxerol has a signature peak with a mass-to-charge ratio (m/z) of 204.

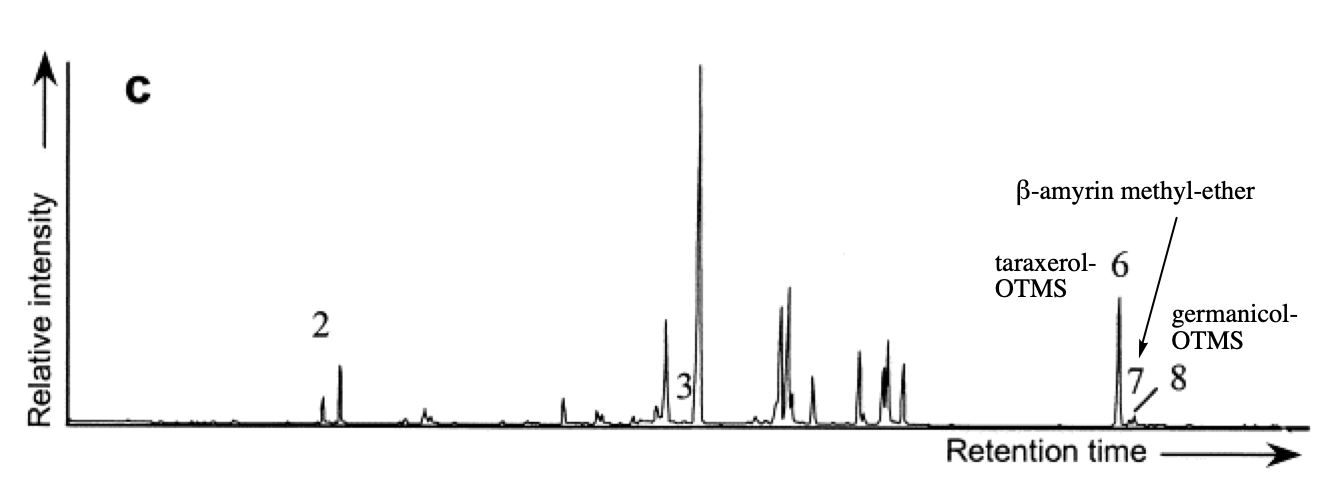
Total ion current traces of R. racemosa saponified leaf extracts, showing taraxerol-OTMS (6) with β-amyrin methyl-ether (7) and germanicol-OTMS (8). Adapted from Versteegh et al. (2004).

=== HPTLC ===
Alternatively, determination and quantification of taraxerol can also be achieved with good reliability and reproducibility using HPTLC. In this case, linear ascending development is performed (e.g. using hexane and ethyl acetate (8:2 v/v) as mobile phase) in a twin trough glass chamber on TLC aluminum plates. Quantification can be achieved by spectrodensitometric scanning at a wavelength of 420 nm.

== Pharmacological research ==
Taraxerol, like many triterpenoid compounds, has been shown to possess anti-inflammatory effects in vitro. It can disrupt the activation of the enzymes MAP3K7 (TAK1), protein kinase B (PKB or Akt), and NF-κB. By doing so, it may inhibit the expression of proinflammatory mediators in microphages.

Taraxerol also exhibits anti-carcinogenic activity. In vivo two-stage carcinogenesis tests of mouse skin tumor showed that taraxerol can inhibit the induction of Epstein-Barr virus early antigen (EBV-EA) by the tumor initiator 7,12-dimethylbenz(a)anthracene (DMBA) and the tumor promoter 12-O-tetradecanoylphorbol-13-acetate (TPA).

In addition, taraxerol can inhibit acetylcholinesterase (AChE) activity in rat's hippocampus.

== See also ==
- Taraxerol synthase
