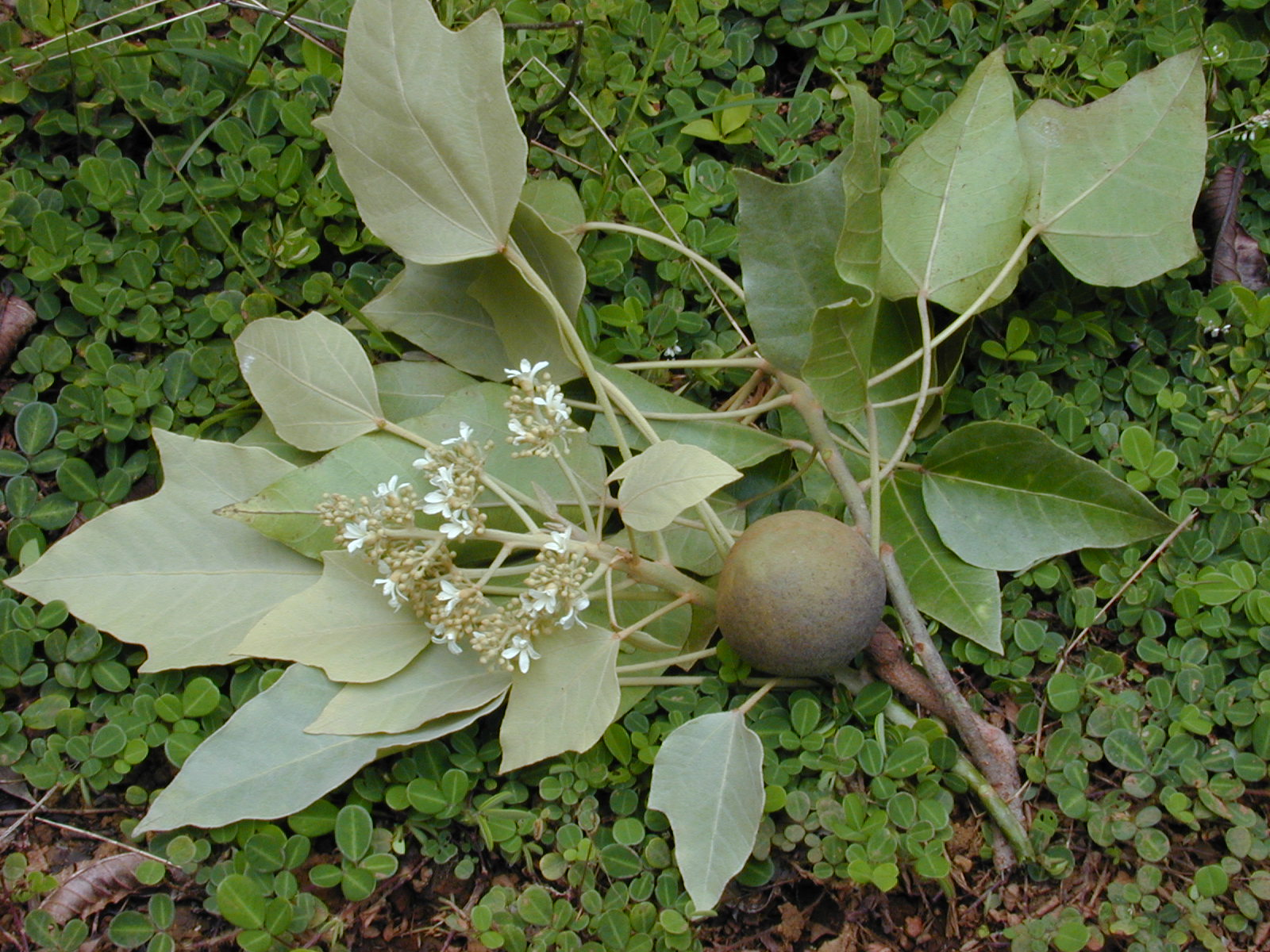
- Parts of the candlenut tree (Aleurites moluccana)

Scientific classification
- Kingdom: Plantae
- Clade: Tracheophytes
- Clade: Angiosperms
- Clade: Eudicots
- Clade: Rosids
- Order: Malpighiales
- Family: Euphorbiaceae; Juss.

Subfamilies
- Acalyphoideae; Crotonoideae; Euphorbioideae

= Euphorbiaceae =

Euphorbiaceae Temporal range: Maastrichtian–Recent

Family of Eudicot flowering plants

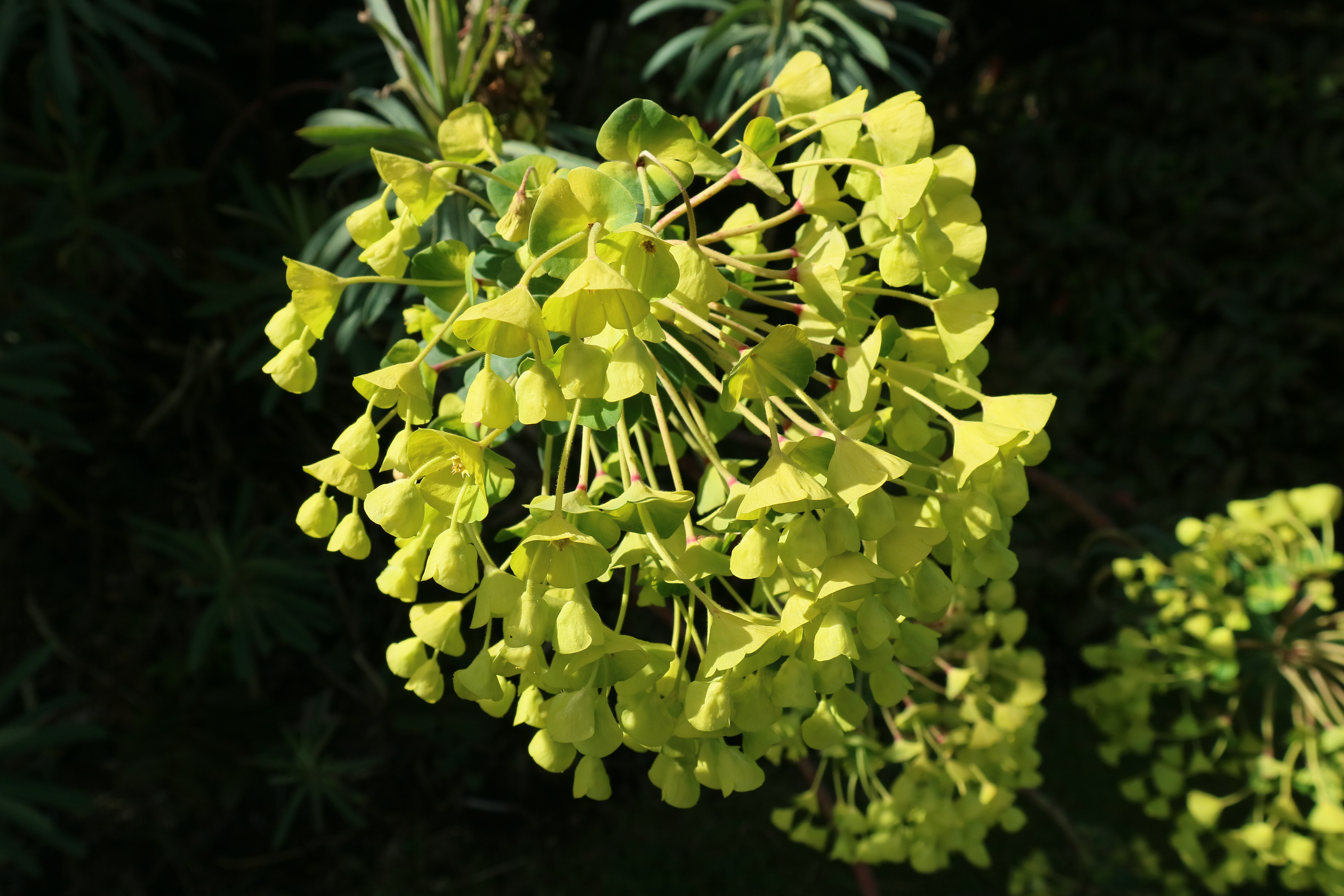
Euphorbia characias flowers

Euphorbiaceae (/juːˈfɔːrbiˌeɪsi.iː, -ˌaɪ/), the spurge family, is a large family of flowering plants. In English, they are also commonly called euphorbias, which is also the name of the type genus of the family. Most spurges, such as Euphorbia paralias, are herbs, but some, especially in the tropics, are shrubs or trees, such as Hevea brasiliensis. Some, such as Euphorbia canariensis, are succulent and resemble cacti because of convergent evolution. This family has a cosmopolitan global distribution. The greatest diversity of species is in the tropics; however, the Euphorbiaceae also have many species in nontropical areas of all continents except Antarctica.

== Description ==
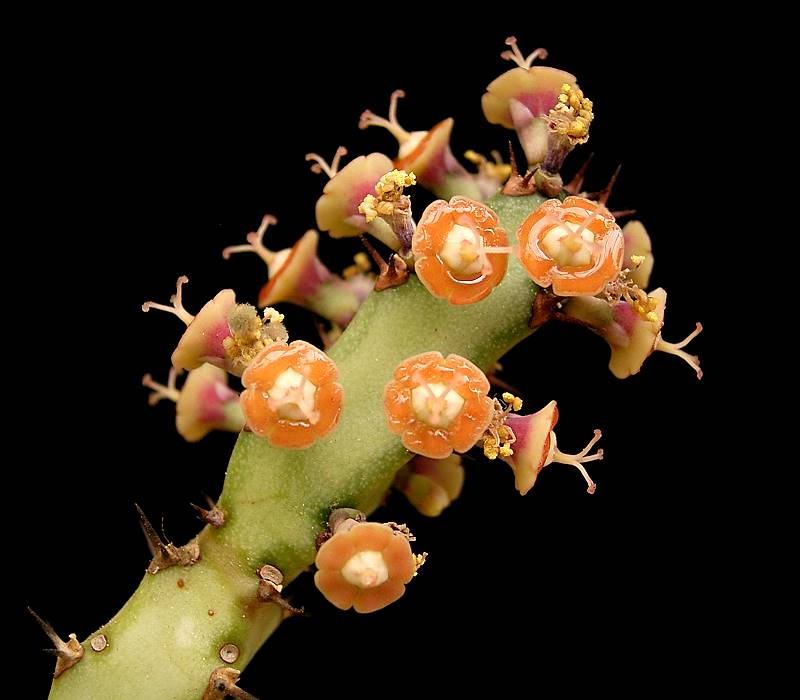
Cyathia of Euphorbia baylissii

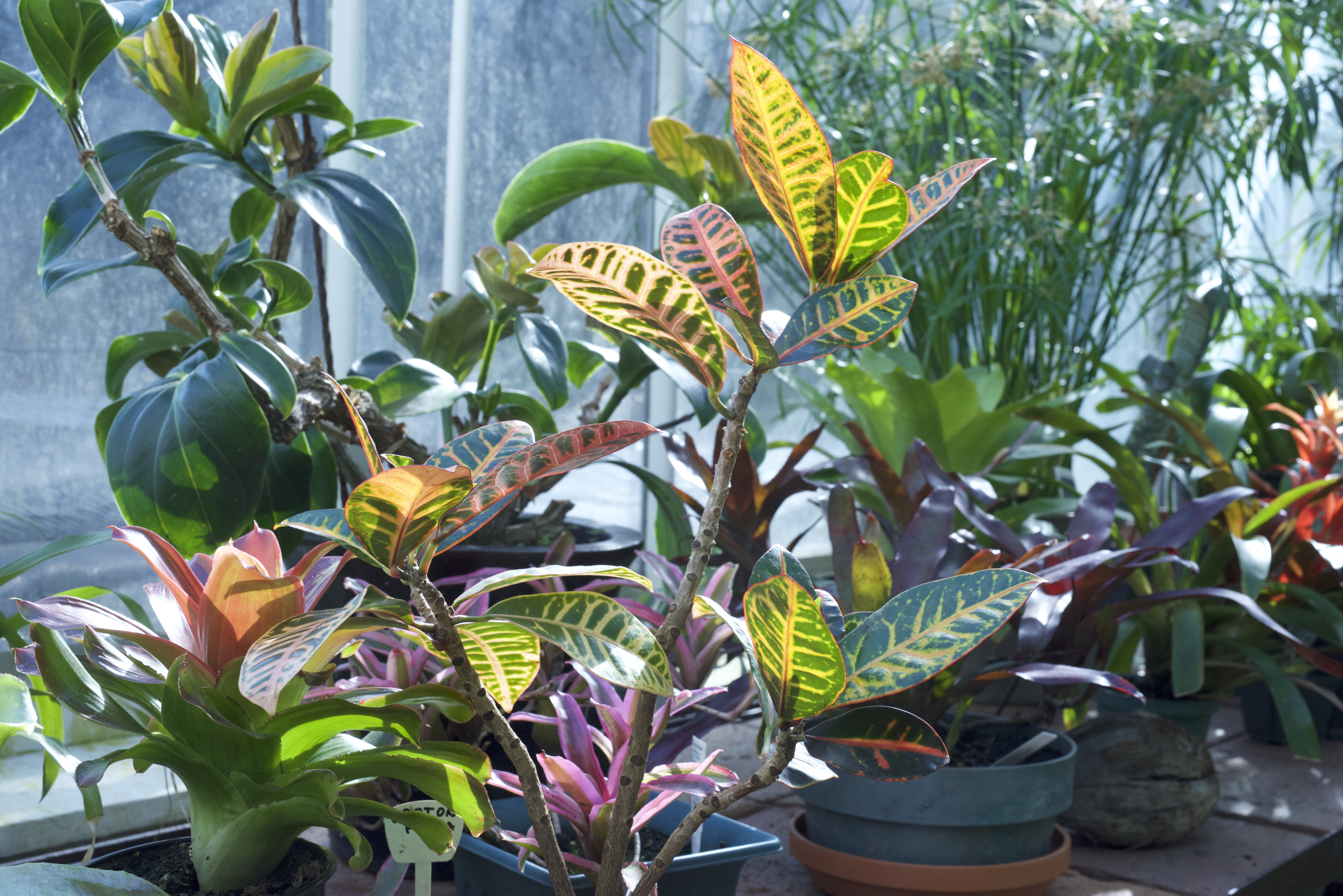
Croton cultivar 'Petra'

The leaves are alternate, seldom opposite, with stipules. They are mainly simple, but where compound, are always palmate, never pinnate. Stipules may be reduced to hairs, glands, or spines, or in succulent species are sometimes absent.

The plants can be monoecious or dioecious. The radially symmetrical flowers are unisexual, with the male and female flowers usually on the same plant. As can be expected from such a large family, a wide variety exists in the structure of the flowers. The stamens (the male organs) number from one to 10 (or even more). The female flowers are hypogynous, that is, with superior ovaries.

The genera in tribe Euphorbieae, subtribe Euphorbiinae (Euphorbia and close relatives) show a highly specialized form of pseudanthium ("false flower" made up of several true flowers) called a cyathium. This is usually a small, cup-like involucre consisting of fused-together bracts and peripheral nectary glands, surrounding a ring of male flowers, each a single stamen. In the middle of the cyathium stands a female flower, a single pistil with branched stigmas. This whole arrangement resembles a single flower.

The fruit is usually a schizocarp, but sometimes a drupe. A typical schizocarp is the regma, a capsular fruit with three or more cells, each of which splits open explosively at maturity, scattering the small seeds.

The family contains a large variety of phytotoxins (toxic substances produced by plants), including diterpene esters, alkaloids, and cyanogenic glycosides (e.g. root tubers of cassava). The seeds of the castor oil plant Ricinus communis contain the highly toxic carbohydrate-binding protein ricin.

A milky latex is a characteristic of the subfamilies Euphorbioideae and Crotonoideae, and the latex of the rubber tree Hevea brasiliensis is the primary source of natural rubber. The latex is poisonous in the Euphorbioideae, but innocuous in the Crotonoideae. White mangrove, also known as blind-your-eye mangrove latex (Excoecaria agallocha), causes blistering on contact and temporary blindness if it contacts the eyes, hence its name. The latex of spurge was used as a laxative.

Twenty first century molecular studies have shown that the enigmatic family Rafflesiaceae, which was only recently recognized to belong to order Malpighiales, is derived from within the Euphorbiaceae.

Euphorbiaceae are monoecious and open pollinated and so self-incompatibility is rare - although it has been reported in the past, apparently this was in error. It is confirmed to be absent or incomplete in herbaceous Chamaesyce by Ehrenfeld 1976, Hevea by Bouharmont 1962, and Manihot by Jennings 1963 and George & Shifriss 1967.

== Taxonomy ==
The family Euphorbiaceae is the fifth-largest flowering plant family and has about 7,500 species organised into 300 genera, 37 tribes, and three subfamilies: Acalyphoideae, Crotonoideae and Euphorbioideae. Amongst the oldest fossils of the group include the permineralised fruit Euphorbiotheca deccanensis from the Intertrappean Beds of India, dating to the late Maastrichtian at the end of the Cretaceous, around 66 million years ago.

== Uses and toxicity ==
Some species of Euphorbiaceae have economic significance, such as cassava (Manihot esculenta), castor oil plant (Ricinus communis), Barbados nut (Jatropha curcas), and the Pará rubber tree (Hevea brasiliensis). Many are grown as ornamental plants, such as poinsettia (Euphorbia pulcherrima) or garden croton (Codiaeum variegatum). Leafy spurge (Euphorbia virgata) and Chinese tallow (Triadica sebifera) are invasive weeds in North America.

Although some species of the Euphorbiaceae have been used in traditional medicine, there is no rigorous clinical evidence that euphorbia extracts are effective for treating any disease.

=== Phytochemistry ===
Phytochemicals found in Euphorbiaceae species include diterpenoids, terpenoids, flavonoids, alkaloids, tannins, neriifolins (also found in oleander), cycloartenol, lectin, and taraxerol, among others.

== Conservation ==
Some species of this family are facing the risk of extinction. These include the Euphorbia species E. appariciana, E. attastoma, E. crossadenia, and E. gymnoclada.
