= Serratenediol =

Names
- IUPAC name (3S,6R,8S,11R,12S,15S,16R,19S,21R)-3,7,7,11,16,20,20-heptamethylpentacyclo[13.8.0.03,12.06,11.016,21]tricos-1(23)-ene-8,19-diol
- Other names Pinusenediol

Identifiers
| CAS Number | 2239-24-9 |
| 3D model (JSmol) | Interactive image |
| PubChem CID | 164947 |
| CompTox Dashboard (EPA) | DTXSID10945039 |
- InChI: InChI=1S/C30H50O2/c1-26(2)21-10-8-19-18-28(5)15-12-22-27(3,4)25(32)14-17-30(22,7)23(28)11-9-20(19)29(21,6)16-13-24(26)31/h8,20-25,31-32H,9-18H2,1-7H3/t20-,21-,22-,23-,24-,25-,28-,29+,30-/m0/s1 Key: FMUNNDDBCLRMSL-PIGMOXAFSA-N
- SMILES: C[C@@]12CC[C@@H]3[C@@]([C@H]1CC[C@H]4C(=CC[C@@H]5[C@@]4(CC[C@@H](C5(C)C)O)C)C2)(CC[C@@H](C3(C)C)O)C

Properties
| Chemical formula | C_{30}H_{50}O_{2} |
| Molar mass | 442.728 g·mol^{−1} |
| Appearance | Powder |
| Solubility in water | poorly soluble |
- Except where otherwise noted, data are given for materials in their standard state (at 25 °C [77 °F], 100 kPa). Infobox references

Serratenediol, first discovered by Y. Inubushi, T. Sano, and Y. Tsuda in 1964, is a naturally occurring pentacyclic triterpenoid. The compound has drawn interest for its distinctive carbon framework and potential biological activities. Serratenediol is characterized by a rare seven‑membered C-ring, a defining feature of the serratene class of triterpenoids, which differentiates it from the more common lupane, oleanane, or ursane types. Additionally unlike other typical triterpenes, which are characterized by eight methyl groups, serratenediol possesses only seven. Structurally, it is further distinguished by its characteristic hydroxyl groups located at the C-3 and C-21 positions. The compound is also known as pinusenediol.

== Stereochemistry and conformation ==
The conformational structure and stereochemistry of serratenediol have been thoroughly researched using a combination of various analytical techniques, including NMR spectroscopy, NMR solvent shift analysis, X-ray crystallography, optical rotary dispersion (ORD), and circular dichroism (CD). These methods confirmed the absolute configuration of the molecule's nine stereocenters across its characteristic 6-6-7-6-6 fused pentacyclic ring system. Additionally it has also been revealed that rings A, B, and C adopt stable chair conformations, while ring D assumes a half-chair conformation and ring E adopts a sofa conformation.

== Natural occurrence and isolation ==
The compound is found primarily in plants of the Lycopodiaceae family, especially in the genus Lycopodium (now often segregated into genera like Huperzia and Phlegmariurus). A standard isolation protocol for the molecule involves utilizing the aerial parts of the clubmoss Lycopodiastrum casuarinoides. The process begins with macerating air-dried plant matter followed by a triple extraction using a 75% ethanol solution. The crude extract undergoes liquid-liquid extraction utilizing ethyl acetate and a 3% tartaric acid solution, causing the target triterpenoid to accumulate in the organic ethyl acetate phase. Final purification is achieved via sequential silica gel column chromatography. Initial elution with a dichloromethane and methanol gradient separates the crude fractions. Subsequent fine purification using a petrolether and ethyl acetate gradient effectively isolates pure serratenediol serrat-en-3β,21α-diol from closely related side-component stereoisomers like serrat-en-3α,21β-diol and serrat-en-3α,21α-diol.

== Synthesis ==
One of the first total syntheses of serratenediol was accomplished by Glenn D. Prestwich and Jeffrey N. Labovitz at Stanford University in 1974. The synthesis relies on biomimetic, non-enzymatic strategies in order to rapidly build the complex ring structure as the precursor of the reaction (3-(m-methoxyphenyl)propanal) is systematically extended branch by branch to reach the target molecule. Some of the commonly practiced organic chemical reactions used in this synthesis include Grignard additions, chloro-ketal Claisen rearrangements, dissolving metal reductions (including the Birch reduction), RuO4 oxidations, Wittig olefinations, esterifications, Collins oxidations, orthoacetate Claisen rearrangements, and standard functional group protection and deprotection steps to manipulate the intermediates.

One reaction step in particular provides the reaction's label namesake of biomimetic, namely the procedures of the polyene cyclization. This transformation follows the Stork-Eschenmoser postulate, which describes the stereospecific, concerted ring closure of a polyene chain into a polycyclic framework in a single step. The reaction is remarkably clean and efficient for this synthesis, as the stereochemistry of the starting material strictly dictates the outcome; the (E)-double bonds of the acyclic precursor invariably direct the formation of all-trans fused ring junctions.

== Biosynthesis ==
The plant biosynthesis of serratenediol occurs via secondary metabolic pathways through downstream modifications of squalene. Research from Saga, et al. on Lycopodium clavatum has brought to light that the carbon backbone preceding serratenediol is oxidized firstly through various oxidosqualene cyclases (OCSs) to 2,3,22,23-dioxidosqualene, which serves as the starting point for various cyclization reactions through the cyclases LCC, LCD, and LCE.

The symmetrical 2,3,22,23-dioxidosqualene precursor is first processed by the enzyme LCC, which catalyzes an epoxide-initiated cationic polycyclization cascade. This enzymatic cascade builds the first two rings of the framework and terminates via deprotonation to yield the stable bicyclic intermediate pre-α-onocerin.

This intermediate is subsequently processed by LCD and LCE, which open the remaining terminal epoxide ring to form two additional rings, resulting in a key carbocation intermediate. From this point, the biosynthesis diverges into two pathways:

- Under the catalysis of LCD, the intermediate undergoes elimination to form α-onocerin. Subsequent protonation of its exocyclic methylene group drives a final cyclization cascade that rearranges the skeleton into the classic serratane framework, yielding serratenediol after a final elimination.
- Alternatively LCE directly converts the intermediate into a pentacyclic carbocation. The primary outcome is the nucleophilic addition of water to yield tohogenol as the major product. Alternatively, a less thermodynamically favored elimination reaction can occur without water addition, yielding serratenediol as a minor byproduct of this pathway.

== Physical properties ==
The compound forms powder. It is poorly soluble in water, but soluble in chloroform, dichloromethane, ethyl acetate, DMSO, acetone, etc.

== Uses ==
Scientific studies have investigated serratenediol for several potential therapeutic applications: anti-inflammatory effects, antiviral activity (it has demonstrated strong inhibitory effects on the activation of the Epstein–Barr virus), and bone health studies. Beyond these areas, its role in cancer research has garnered particular attention. Notably, a 2012 study conducted by the Jeju Biodiversity Research Institute of the Republic of Korea revealed that the compound is highly capable of influencing human tumor cells. The basis of this discovery is built upon the presence of various Lycopodium species used in certain traditional Chinese and Korean medicine as a form of cancer therapy. Building also on earlier animal models demonstrating that these triterpenes inhibit tumor progression, these researchers evaluated the specific effects of serratenediol on human leukemia (HL-60) cells. The compound demonstrated a powerful, dose-dependent growth inhibition on the cancer cells, achieving a 50% reduction in tumor cell growth at a concentration of just 12.5 µM, which increased to over 80% inhibition at 50 µM. This antiproliferative effect is driven by the induction of programmed cell death (apoptosis); serratenediol actively decreases the expression of anti-apoptotic proteins like Bcl-xL while simultaneously increasing pro-apoptotic proteins like Bax. Crucially, parallel testing on normal, healthy body cells (RAW264.7) showed that serratenediol maintains high selectivity for cancer tissue, as healthy cell viability remained safely above 90% even at the maximum tested concentrations.
