= Daturadiol =

Names
- Preferred IUPAC name (3S,4aR,5R,6aR,6bS,8aR,12aR,14aR,14bR)-4,4,6a,6b,8a,11,11,14b-Octamethyl-1,2,3,4,4a,5,6,6a,6b,7,8,8a,9,10,11,12,12a,14,14a,14b-icosahydropicene-3,5-diol

Identifiers
CAS Number	41498-79-7
3D model (JSmol)	Interactive image
ChEBI	CHEBI:138955
ChEMBL	ChEMBL3633243
ChemSpider	2341835
KEGG	C21821
PubChem CID	3084830
CompTox Dashboard (EPA)	DTXSID60961769
- InChI: InChI=1S/C30H50O2/c1-25(2)13-14-27(5)15-16-29(7)19(20(27)17-25)9-10-22-28(6)12-11-23(32)26(3,4)24(28)21(31)18-30(22,29)8/h9,20-24,31-32H,10-18H2,1-8H3/t20-,21+,22+,23-,24-,27+,28+,29+,30+/m0/s1 Key: JYNBNJRQZZSLPN-NYVWVNPOSA-N
- SMILES: C[C@@]12CC[C@@]3(C(=CC[C@H]4[C@]3(C[C@H]([C@@H]5[C@@]4(CC[C@@H](C5(C)C)O)C)O)C)[C@@H]1CC(CC2)(C)C)C

Properties
Chemical formula	C_{30}H_{50}O_{2}
Molar mass	442.728 g·mol^{−1}
- Except where otherwise noted, data are given for materials in their standard state (at 25 °C [77 °F], 100 kPa). Infobox references

Daturadiol is a pentacyclic triterpenoid found in Datura species including Datura stramonium and Datura innoxia. It is also found in non-Solanaceae plants such as Vernicia fordii and Terminalia brasiliensis.

== See also ==
- Anisodamine
- Daturaolone
- Oleanane
