= Taraxacoside =

Names
- IUPAC name 4,5-Dihydroxy-2-(hydroxymethyl)-6-[(5-oxooxolan-3-yl)oxy]oxan-3-yl 2-(4-hydroxyphenyl)acetate

Identifiers
CAS Number	98449-40-2
3D model (JSmol)	Interactive image
ChEBI	CHEBI:168895
PubChem CID	131750952
CompTox Dashboard (EPA)	DTXSID801130903
- InChI: InChI=1S/C18H22O10/c19-7-12-17(28-14(22)5-9-1-3-10(20)4-2-9)15(23)16(24)18(27-12)26-11-6-13(21)25-8-11/h1-4,11-12,15-20,23-24H,5-8H2 Key: ZNBBYALXAQXHJE-UHFFFAOYSA-N
- SMILES: C1C(COC1=O)OC2C(C(C(C(O2)CO)OC(=O)CC3=CC=C(C=C3)O)O)O

Properties
Chemical formula	C_{18}H_{22}O_{10}
Molar mass	398.364 g·mol^{−1}
- Except where otherwise noted, data are given for materials in their standard state (at 25 °C [77 °F], 100 kPa). Infobox references

Taraxacoside is an acylated γ-butyrolactone glycoside with the molecular formula C_{18}H_{22}O_{10} which has been isolated from roots of the plant Taraxacum officinale.
