= Daucosterol =

Names
- Preferred IUPAC name (2R,3R,4S,5S,6R)-2-({(1R,3aS,3bS,7S,9aR,9bS,11aR)-1-[(2R,5R)-5-Ethyl-6-methylheptan-2-yl]-9a,11a-dimethyl-2,3,3a,3b,4,6,7,8,9,9a,9b,10,11,11a-tetradecahydro-1H-cyclopenta[a]phenanthren-7-yl}oxy)-6-(hydroxymethyl)oxane-3,4,5-triol
- Other names Lyoniside, Daucosterol, Sitogluside, Eleutheroside A, Alexandrin, Coriandrinol, Daucosterin, β-Sitosterol glucoside

Identifiers
| CAS Number | 474-58-8 |
| 3D model (JSmol) | Interactive image |
| ChEBI | CHEBI:67554 |
| ChemSpider | 4674825 |
| PubChem CID | 5742590 |
| UNII | U45VN859W3 |
| CompTox Dashboard (EPA) | DTXSID301045674 |
- InChI: InChI=1S/C35H60O6/c1-7-22(20(2)3)9-8-21(4)26-12-13-27-25-11-10-23-18-24(14-16-34(23,5)28(25)15-17-35(26,27)6)40-33-32(39)31(38)30(37)29(19-36)41-33/h10,20-22,24-33,36-39H,7-9,11-19H2,1-6H3/t21-,22-,24+,25+,26-,27+,28+,29-,30-,31+,32-,33-,34+,35-/m1/s1 Key: NPJICTMALKLTFW-OFUAXYCQSA-N
- SMILES: CC[C@H](CC[C@@H](C)[C@H]1CC[C@@H]2[C@@]1(CC[C@H]3[C@H]2CC=C4[C@@]3(CC[C@@H](C4)O[C@H]5[C@@H]([C@H]([C@@H]([C@H](O5)CO)O)O)O)C)C)C(C)C

Properties
| Chemical formula | C_{35}H_{60}O_{6} |
| Molar mass | 576.859 g·mol^{−1} |
- Except where otherwise noted, data are given for materials in their standard state (at 25 °C [77 °F], 100 kPa). Infobox references

Daucosterol (eleutheroside A) is a natural phytosterol-like compound. It is the glucoside of β-sitosterol.
