= Taraxacin =

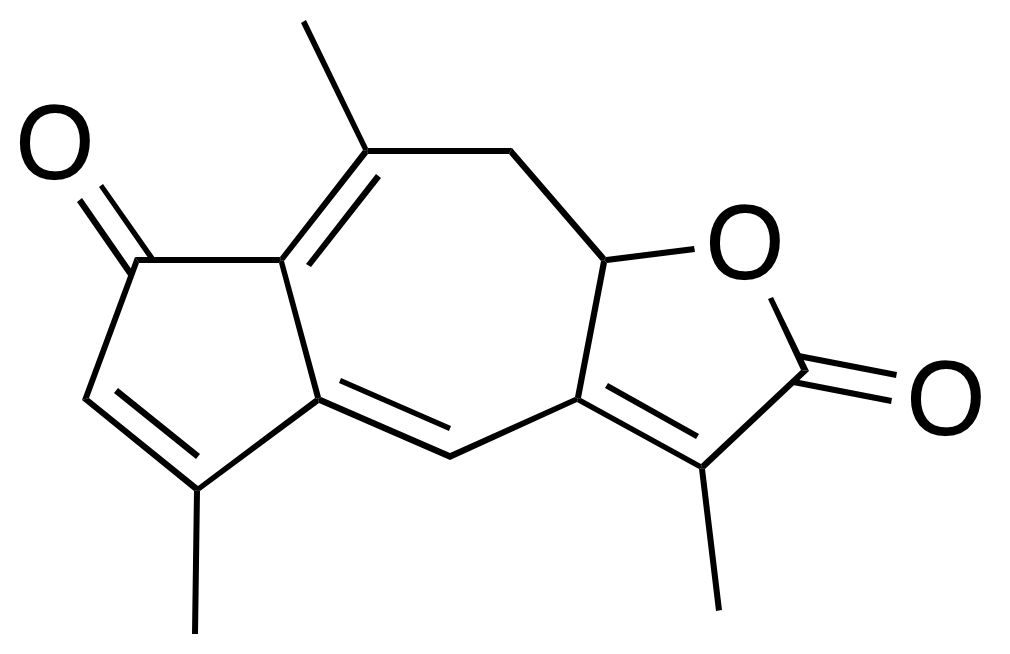

Names
- IUPAC name 1,5,8-trimethyl-3a,4-dihydroazuleno[6,5-b]furan-2,6-dione
- Other names SCHEMBL456260, CHEMBL449951

Identifiers
CAS Number	284666-72-4
3D model (JSmol)	Interactive image
ChEMBL	ChEMBL449951
ChemSpider	4410675
PubChem CID	5241825
CompTox Dashboard (EPA)	DTXSID301336861
- InChI: InChI=1S/C15H14O3/c1-7-4-12(16)14-8(2)5-13-11(6-10(7)14)9(3)15(17)18-13/h4,6,13H,5H2,1-3H3; Key: BAHMQESJBKGPTE-UHFFFAOYSA-N
- SMILES: CC1=C(C(C=C2C)=O)C2=CC(C3C1)=C(C)C(O3)=O

Properties
Chemical formula	C_{15}H_{14}O_{3}
Molar mass	242.274 g·mol^{−1}
- Except where otherwise noted, data are given for materials in their standard state (at 25 °C [77 °F], 100 kPa). Infobox references

Taraxacin is a guaianolide with the molecular formula C_{15}H_{14}O_{3} which has been isolated from the plant Taraxacum officinale. Taraxacin has a bitter taste. Taraxacin has diuretic properties.
