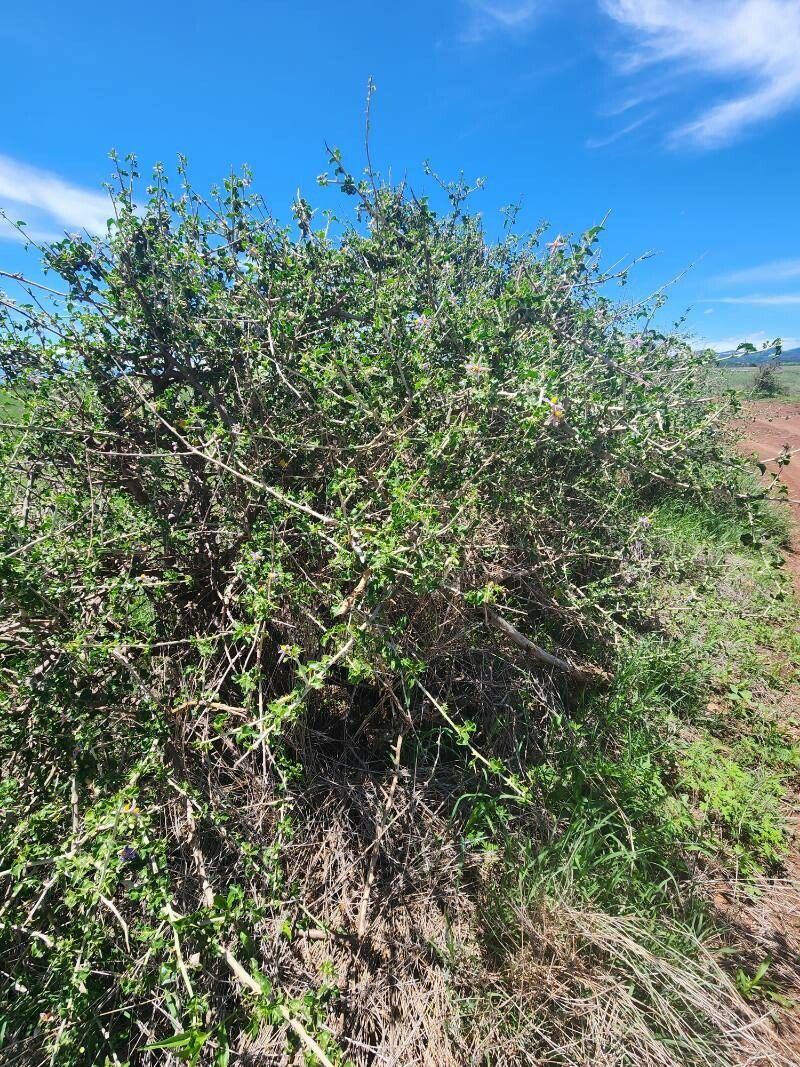
- Overall view of a Solanum arundo plant.

Scientific classification
- Kingdom: Plantae
- Clade: Tracheophytes
- Clade: Angiosperms
- Clade: Eudicots
- Clade: Asterids
- Order: Solanales
- Family: Solanaceae
- Genus: Solanum
- Species: S. arundo

Binomial name
- Solanum arundo Mattei, 1908

= Solanum arundo =

Plant species of the genus Solanum

Solanum arundo is a plant species with distribution in Eastern Africa and India.

== Description ==
It is a prickly shrub that stands from 2–6 meters tall, with purple flowers. It produces yellow fruit.

Details of Solanum arundo
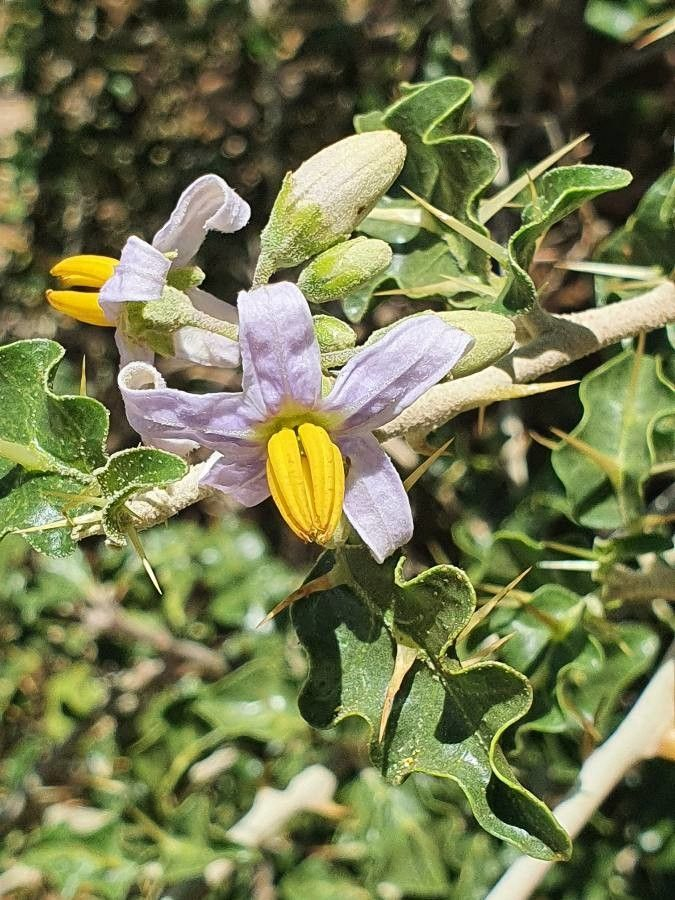
The purple flowers of Solanum arundo

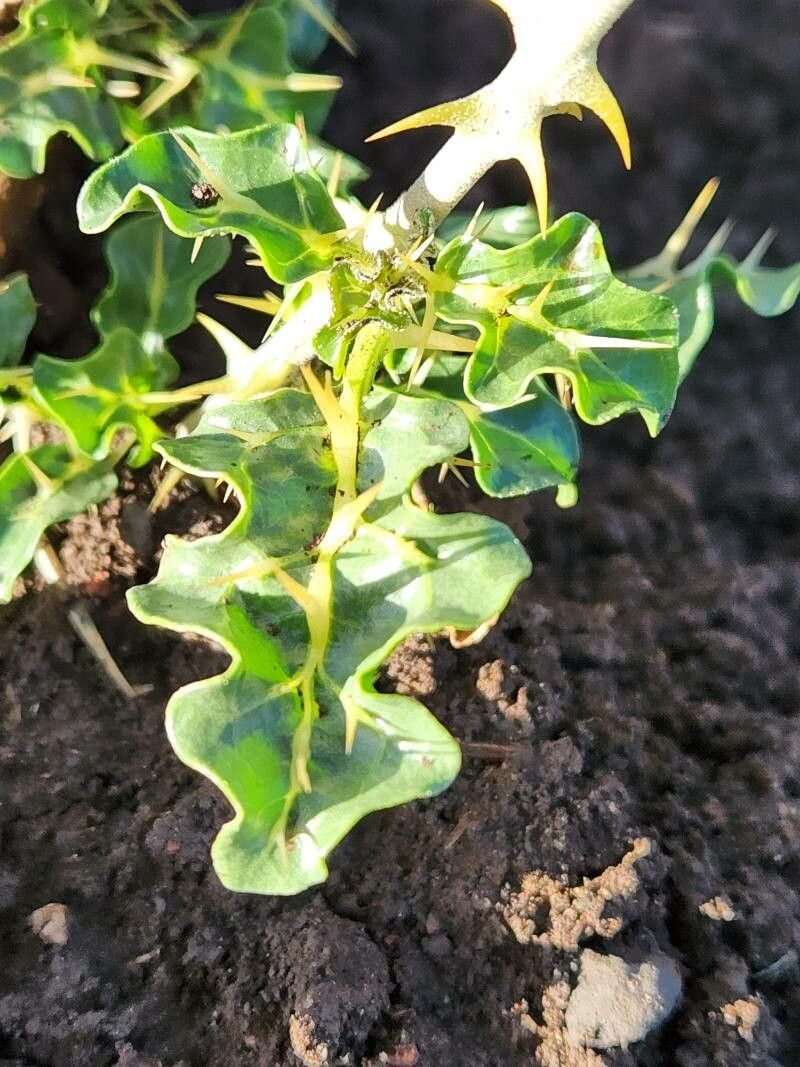
The leaves of Solanum arundo
