= Oleanane =

18β-Oleanane

Names
- IUPAC name Oleanane
- Systematic IUPAC name (4aR,6aR,6bR,8aS,12aS,12bR,14aR,14bS)-2,2,4a,6a,6b,9,9,12a-Octamethyldocosahydropicene

Identifiers
CAS Number	471-67-0
ChEBI	CHEBI:36481
ChemSpider	7827640
PubChem CID	9548717
UNII	CB9Y4447CP
CompTox Dashboard (EPA)	DTXSID00872582
- InChI: InChI=1S/C30H52/c1-25(2)16-17-27(5)18-19-29(7)21(22(27)20-25)10-11-24-28(6)14-9-13-26(3,4)23(28)12-15-30(24,29)8/h21-24H,9-20H2,1-8H3/t21-,22+,23+,24-,27-,28+,29-,30-/m1/s1 Key: VCNKUCWWHVTTBY-KQCVGMHHSA-N; InChI=1/C30H52/c1-25(2)16-17-27(5)18-19-29(7)21(22(27)20-25)10-11-24-28(6)14-9-13-26(3,4)23(28)12-15-30(24,29)8/h21-24H,9-20H2,1-8H3/t21-,22+,23+,24-,27-,28+,29-,30-/m1/s1 Key: VCNKUCWWHVTTBY-KQCVGMHHBI

Properties
Chemical formula	C_{30}H_{52}
Molar mass	412.746 g·mol^{−1}
- Except where otherwise noted, data are given for materials in their standard state (at 25 °C [77 °F], 100 kPa). verify (what is ?) Infobox references

Oleanane is a natural triterpenoid. It is commonly found in woody angiosperms and as a result is often used as an indicator of these plants in the fossil record. It is a member of the oleanoid series, which consists of pentacyclic triterpenoids (such as beta-amyrin and taraxerol) where all rings are six-membered.

== Structure ==
Oleanane is a pentacyclic triterpenoid, a class of molecules made up of six connected isoprene units. The naming of both the ring structures and individual carbon atoms in oleanane is the same as in steroids. As such, it consists of a A, B, C, D, and E ring, all of which are six-membered rings.

The structure of oleanane contains a number of different methyl groups, that vary in orientation between different oleananes. For example, in 18-alpha-oleanane contains a downward facing methyl group for the 18th carbon atom, while 18-beta-oleanane contains an upward facing methyl group at the same position.

A and B rings of the oleanane structure are identical to that of hopane. As a result, both molecules produce a fragment of m/z 191. Because this fragment is often used to identify hopanes, oleanane can be mis-identified in hopane analysis.

== Synthesis ==
Like other triterpenoids, are formed from six combined isoprene units. These isoprene units can be combined via a number of different pathways. In eukaryotes (including plants), this pathway is the mevalonate (MVA) pathway. For the formation of steroids and other triterpenoids the isoprenoids are combined into a precursor known as squalene, which then undergoes enzymatic cyclization to produce the various different triterpenoids, including oleanane.

Once the oleananes have been transported into rocks or sediments they will undergo further alteration before they are measured.

== Measurement in Rock Samples ==
Oleananes can be identified in extracts from rock samples (or plants) using GC/MS. A GC/MS is a gas chromatograph coupled with a mass spectrometer. The sample is first injected into the system, then run through as chromatographic column. How fast a material moves through a chromatographic column depends on how long it spends in each of the two stages there. Compounds that partition more into the mobile phase will move faster as opposed to compounds that partition more into the stationary phase. The result of this is a separation of different organic molecules based on their retention time in the GC.

After being separated by the GC, the compounds can then be analyzed by a mass spectrometer. Each compound will contain a characteristic mass spectrum, based on the fragments it splits into during ionization in the mass spectrometer. This means that the GC can not only separate different types of molecules, it can also identify them.

As mentioned above, they have a characteristic mass fragment at m/z = 191, and thus will appear in the same selected ion chromatograph (SIC) as hopanes. This can help one identify them in GC/MS datasets.

== Uses ==
=== As a biomarker ===
Oleanane has been identified as a compound in modern day angiosperms.

Because of this, its presence is the fossil record has also been used to trace angiosperms through the fossil record. For example, the ratio of 18-alpha-oleanane + 18-beta-oleanane:17-alpha-hopane in rock extracts (and associated petroleums/oils) has been found to correlate (at least broadly) to the presence of angiosperms in the fossil record. In this study, the combination of alpha and beta-oleanane were used as indicators for the presence of angiosperms. They are normalized to hopanes, which are broadly present in almost all rock extracts coming from petroleum. Furthermore, because of the structural similarities between hopanes and oleananes, it is assumed that they will react similarly to the various weathering processes that degrade the biomarkers present. As such, the ratio of hopanes to oleananes should be similar to the initial ratio, and unaffected by processes occurring in the rock after fossilization.

There is some delay in the accepted increases in taxonomic diversification of angiosperms (which occurred during the mid-Cretaceous period) and the increase of oleanane concentrations in the fossil record (which occurred in the late-Cretaceous or even after). This could be due to a number of factors, one being that the early angiosperms were more herbaceous than woody and that woody angiosperms only appeared after further taxonomic diversification.

Lastly, the study introduced the idea of an "oleanane parameter," which could be used in assessing angiosperm input to petroleum sources. This, in turn, gives some idea of the age of said petroleum sources.

That being said, the presence of angiosperms may not be the only thing affecting the oleanane content of sediments, rock extracts and petroleum. For example, there is evidence that contact with seawater during early sedimentation processes can increase the concentration of oleananes in the mature sediment. This evidence comes from the fact that various indicators of marine influence (C27/C29 sterane ratios, changes in elemental composition in the downstream direction that are indicative of the infiltration of water into the system and the homophane index). Despite this, it is still unclear as to how marine influence enhances the expression of oleananes (thus increasing observed concentration). Some ideas include the changes in pH, Eh and the microbial environment that come with the interaction with seawater.

== See also ==
- Oleanolic acid
