= Syringaresinol =

Names
- IUPAC name (7α,7′α,8α,8′α)-3,3′,5,5′-Tetramethoxy-7,9′:7′,9-diepoxylignane-4,4′-diol
- Systematic IUPAC name 4,4′-[(1R,3aS,4R,6aS)-Tetrahydro-1H,3H-furo[3,4-c]furan-1,4-diyl]bis(2,6-dimethoxyphenol)
- Other names (+)-Syringaresinol

Identifiers
CAS Number	21453-69-0
3D model (JSmol)	Interactive image
ChEBI	CHEBI:47
ChEMBL	ChEMBL361362
ChemSpider	391324
KEGG	C10889
PubChem CID	443023
UNII	155K1084GO
CompTox Dashboard (EPA)	DTXSID30944049
- InChI: InChI=1S/C22H26O8/c1-25-15-5-11(6-16(26-2)19(15)23)21-13-9-30-22(14(13)10-29-21)12-7-17(27-3)20(24)18(8-12)28-4/h5-8,13-14,21-24H,9-10H2,1-4H3/t13-,14-,21+,22+/m0/s1 Key: KOWMJRJXZMEZLD-HCIHMXRSSA-N
- SMILES: O4[C@H](c1cc(OC)c(O)c(OC)c1)[C@@H]2[C@@H]([C@H](OC2)c3cc(OC)c(O)c(OC)c3)C4

Properties
Chemical formula	C_{22}H_{26}O_{8}
Molar mass	418.442 g·mol^{−1}
- Except where otherwise noted, data are given for materials in their standard state (at 25 °C [77 °F], 100 kPa). Infobox references

Syringaresinol is a lignan found in Castela emoryi, in Prunus mume.

This compound inhibits Helicobacter pylori motility in vitro.
