= Arnidiol =

Names
- IUPAC name (3S,4aR,6aR,6aR,6bR,8S,8aS,12S,12aR,14aR,14bR)-4,4,6a,6b,8a,12,14b-Heptamethyl-11-methylidene-1,2,3,4a,5,6,6a,7,8,9,10,12,12a,13,14,14a-hexadecahydropicene-3,8-diol

Identifiers
CAS Number	6750-30-7
3D model (JSmol)	Interactive image
ChemSpider	8653958
PubChem CID	10478550
UNII	B94L6R1Z6C
CompTox Dashboard (EPA)	DTXSID50986880
- InChI: InChI=1S/C30H50O2/c1-18-11-14-28(6)24(32)17-30(8)20(25(28)19(18)2)9-10-22-27(5)15-13-23(31)26(3,4)21(27)12-16-29(22,30)7/h19-25,31-32H,1,9-17H2,2-8H3/t19-,20-,21+,22-,23+,24+,25-,27+,28-,29-,30-/m1/s1 Key: IOPDFSGGBHSXSV-UHFFFAOYSA-N
- SMILES: C[C@H]1[C@@H]2[C@H]3CC[C@@H]4[C@]5(CC[C@@H](C([C@@H]5CC[C@]4([C@@]3(C[C@@H]([C@]2(CCC1=C)C)O)C)C)(C)C)O)C

Properties
Chemical formula	C_{30}H_{50}O_{2}
Molar mass	442.728 g·mol^{−1}
Melting point	256 °C (493 °F; 529 K)
- Except where otherwise noted, data are given for materials in their standard state (at 25 °C [77 °F], 100 kPa). Infobox references

Arnidiol is a cytotoxic triterpene with the molecular formula C_{30}H_{50}O_{2}. Arnidiol has been first isolated from the bloom of the plant Arnica montana. Arnidiol has also been isolated from the plant Taraxacum officinale.
