= Taraxasterol =

Names
- IUPAC name 18α,19α-Urs-20(30)-en-3β-ol
- Systematic IUPAC name (3S,4aR,6aR,6bR,8aR,12S,12aR,12bR,14aR,14bR)-4,4,6a,6b,8a,12,14b-Heptamethyl-11-methylidenedocosahydropicen-3-ol
- Other names Anthesterin

Identifiers
CAS Number	1059-14-9
3D model (JSmol)	Interactive image
ChEBI	CHEBI:9401
ChEMBL	ChEMBL453386
ChemSpider	103120
PubChem CID	115250
UNII	64SK2ERN9P
CompTox Dashboard (EPA)	DTXSID30909815
- InChI: InChI=1S/C18H17ClO6/c1-9-6-15-14(25-15)5-3-2-4-10(20)7-11-16(18(23)24-9)12(21)8-13(22)17(11)19/h2-5,8-9,14-15,21-22H,6-7H2,1H3/b4-2+,5-3-/t9-,14-,15-/m1/s1 Key: WYZWZEOGROVVHK-GTMNPGAYSA-N; InChI=1S/C30H50O/c1-19-11-14-27(5)17-18-29(7)21(25(27)20(19)2)9-10-23-28(6)15-13-24(31)26(3,4)22(28)12-16-30(23,29)8/h20-25,31H,1,9-18H2,2-8H3/t20-,21-,22+,23-,24+,25-,27-,28+,29-,30-/m1/s1 Key: XWMMEBCFHUKHEX-ZJJHUPNDSA-N
- SMILES: O[C@H]1CC[C@@]2(C)[C@](CC[C@]3(C)[C@]2([H])CC[C@@]4([H])[C@@]3(C)CC[C@](CC5)(C)[C@]4([H])[C@H](C)C5=C)([H])C1(C)C

Properties
Chemical formula	C_{30}H_{50}O
Molar mass	426.729 g·mol^{−1}
- Except where otherwise noted, data are given for materials in their standard state (at 25 °C [77 °F], 100 kPa). verify (what is ?) Infobox references

Taraxasterol (anthesterin) is a triterpene derived from the mevalonate pathway and is found in dandelions.

== Biosynthesis ==
The precursor for the biosynthesis of taraxasterol is squalene. In the first step of this formation squalene is cyclized with molecular oxygen, FAD, and NADPH via the enzyme squalene epoxidase a flavoprotein to yield (2S)-2,3-oxidosqualene. In the second step if the oxidosqualene is folded in the chair conformation in the enzyme a cascade of cyclizations will occur that results in the formation of the dammarenyl cation.

The dammarenyl cation is then subjected to an alkyl shift to create a six-membered ring and relieving ring strain to form the baccharenyl cation. This allows the baccharenyl double bond to attack the secondary positive charge and forms a pentacyclic ring system to yield the tertiary lupanyl cation. A Wagner-Meerwein 1,2-alykl shift will occur to form the hexacyclic ring system and the secondary oleanyl cation. This is followed by a Wagner-Meerwein 1,2-methyl shift to create the tertiary taraxasteryl cation. This cation is the last intermediate in the taraxasterol pathway. An E2 reaction follows where deprotonation of a proton yields taraxasterol. The enzymes involved in this biosynthesis are oxidosesqualene: lupeopl cyclase and oxidosqualene: B-amyrin cyclase.

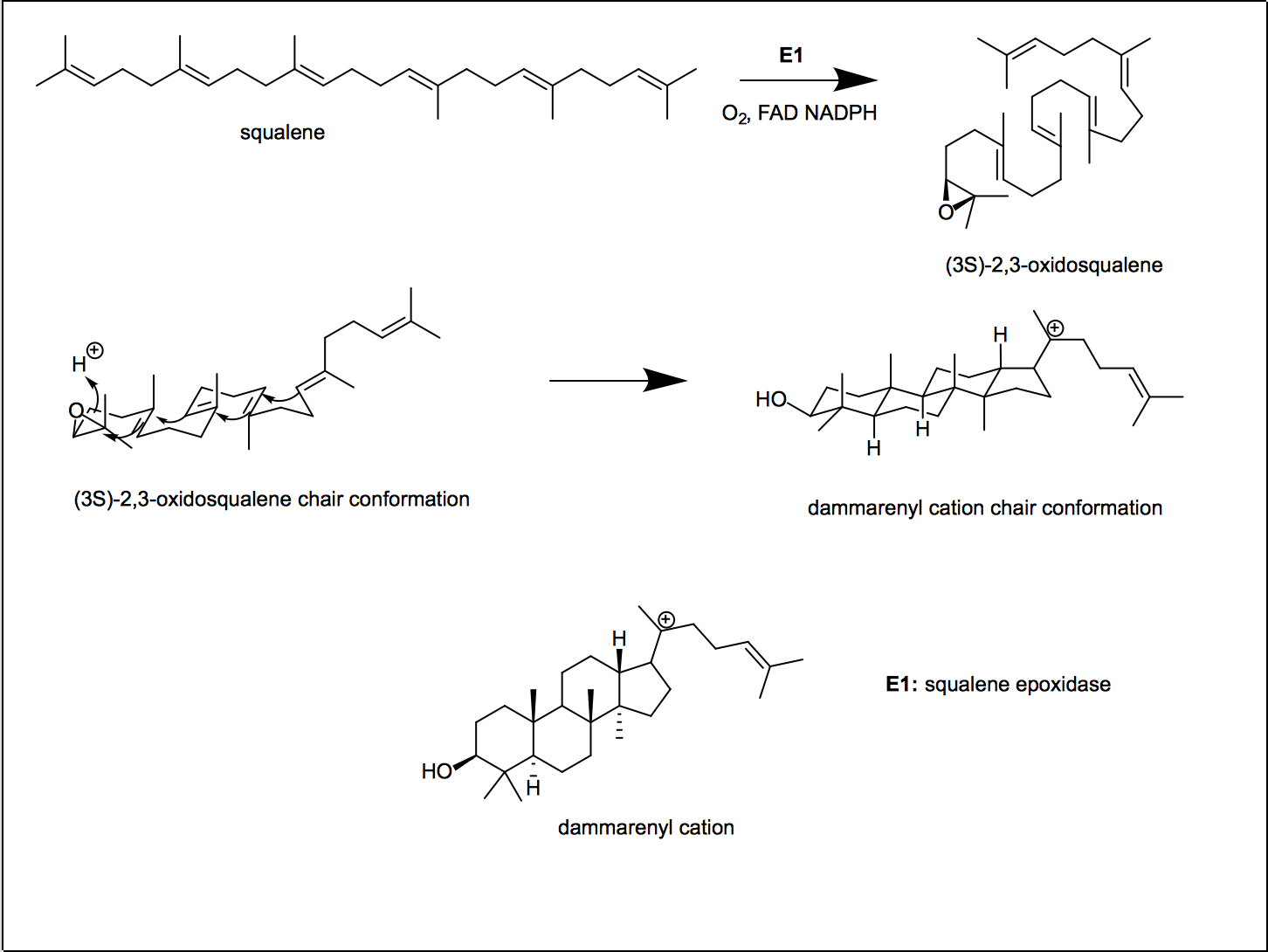
Dammarenyl cation

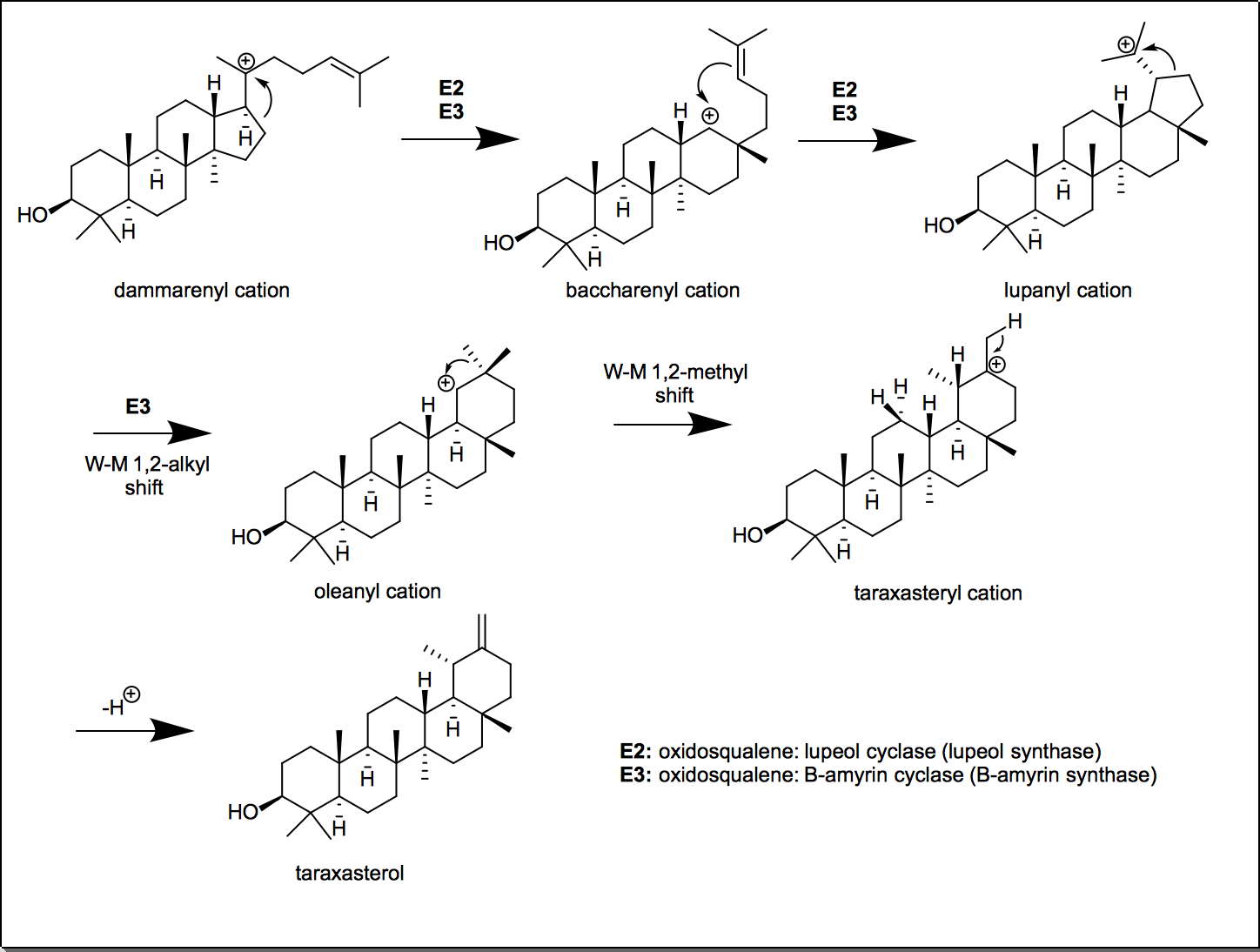
Taraxasterol synthesis
