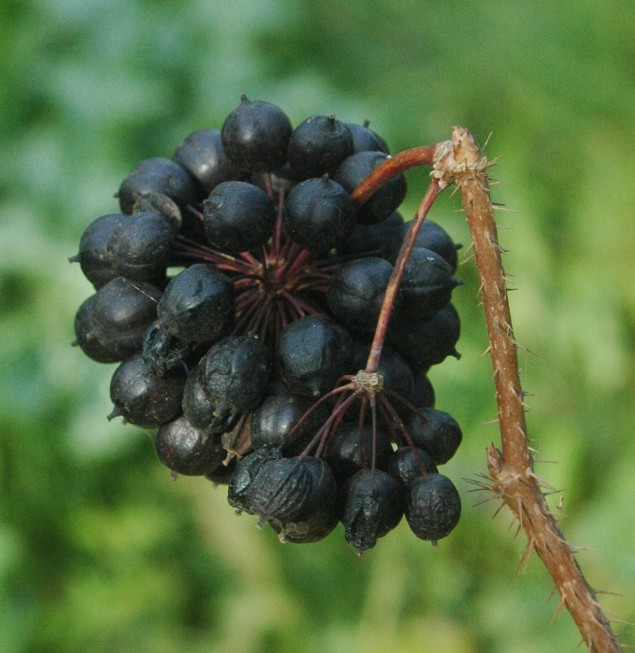

Scientific classification
- Kingdom: Plantae
- Clade: Tracheophytes
- Clade: Angiosperms
- Clade: Eudicots
- Clade: Asterids
- Order: Apiales
- Family: Araliaceae
- Genus: Eleutherococcus
- Species: E. senticosus

Binomial name
- Eleutherococcus senticosus (Rupr. & Maxim.) Maxim.

Synonyms
- Homotypic Synonyms: Acanthopanax senticosus (Rupr. & Maxim.) Harms; Hedera senticosa Rupr. & Maxim.; Heterotypic Synonyms: Acanthopanax asperatus Franch. & Sav.; Acanthopanax senticosus var. brevistamineus S.F.Gu; Acanthopanax senticosus f. inermis (Kom.) Harms; Acanthopanax senticosus f. subinermis (Regel) Harms; Acanthopanax senticosus var. subinermis (Regel) Kitag.; Eleutherococcus asperatus (Franch. & Sav.) Koidz.; Eleutherococcus koreanus Nakai; Eleutherococcus senticosus f. inermis Kom.; Eleutherococcus senticosus f. subinermis Regel

= Eleutherococcus senticosus =

Species of flowering plant

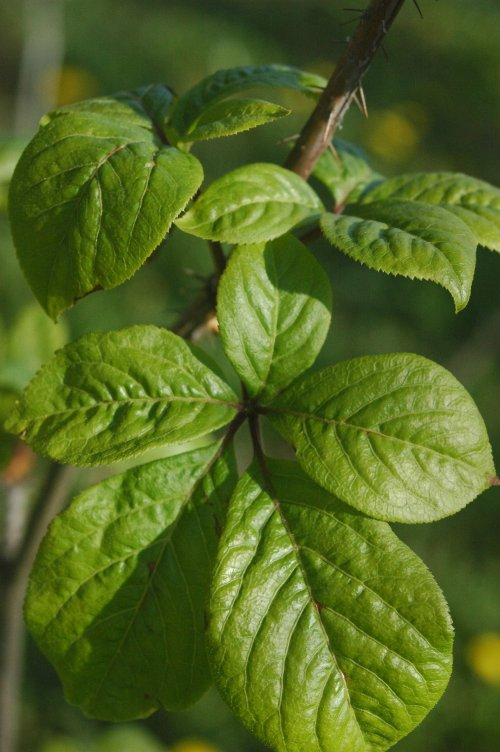
Eleutherococcus senticosus leaves

Eleutherococcus senticosus is a species of small, woody shrub in the family Araliaceae. It is native to Northeastern Asia. It may be colloquially called devil's bush, Siberian ginseng, taiga root, eleuthero, ciwujia, Devil's shrub, shigoka, touch-me-not, wild pepper, or kan jang. E. senticosus has a history of use in folklore and traditional Chinese medicine. Root extracts of E. senticosus are sold as a dietary supplement or cosmetic, usually under the name Siberian ginseng.

== Etymology ==
The scientific name (genus), Eleutherococcus (from Greek) means "free-berried", and senticosus (from Latin) means sentis (thorn-bush, briar), an adjective meaning "thorny" or "full of briers or thorns". It is not the same plant as American ginseng (Panax quinquefolius) or Asian ginseng (Panax ginseng). It has a diversity of common names across its range of distribution.

== Distribution and habitat ==
The herb grows in mixed and coniferous mountain forests, forming low undergrowth or is found in groups in thickets and edges. Eleutherococcus senticosus is sometimes found in oak groves at the foot of cliffs, rarely in high forest riparian woodland. Its native habitat is East Asia, China, Japan, and Russia. E. senticosus is broadly tolerant of soils, growing in sandy, loamy, and heavy clay soils with acid, neutral, or alkaline chemistry and including soils of low nutritional value. It can tolerate sun or dappled shade and some degree of pollution. E. senticosus is a deciduous shrub growing to 2 metres (6.6 ft) at a slow rate. It is hardy to zone 3. It flowers in July in most habitats. The flowers are hermaphroditic and are pollinated by insects.

== Extract and chemical constituents ==
Roots of E. senticosus are cylindrical, up to 0.5 centimetres (0.20 in) in diameter, straight or branched, dark brown, and have a smooth surface with bark fixed closely to the xylem. The derived extract from the roots has been characterized for its major constituents, including lignans, sesamin (eleutheroside B4), syringaresinol, phenylpropanes, coumarins, beta-sitosterol and daucosterol.

Berries from E. senticosus contain diverse polyphenols, including caffeic acid, vanillic acid, ferulic acid, p-coumaric acid, and benzoic acid, with significant content of calcium, magnesium, and potassium.

Major constituents of essential oil from leaves of Eleutherococcus senticosus include α-bisabolol (26%), β-caryophyllene (7%), germacrene D (7%), β-bisabolene (5%), and α-humulene (4%).

== Traditional medicine ==
Extracts from the root of Eleutherococcus senticosus, including eleutherosides, are promoted in alternative and traditional medicine for providing health effects. According to the WHO, only use "as a prophylactic and restorative tonic for enhancement of mental and physical capacities in cases of weakness, exhaustion and tiredness, and during convalescence" is backed up by clinical evidence. The plant has been assessed in preliminary research for its potential use as an antimicrobial or antistress agent.

=== Potential for adverse effects ===
People with high blood pressure, sleep apnea, narcolepsy, heart disease, mental illness, a compromised immune system, people in the process of pregnancy and lactation, and people taking digoxin or hexobarbital may have adverse reactions to E. senticosus. High doses may cause irritability, confusion, insomnia, or anxiety.
