= Amyrin =

Amyrins
- α-Amyrin

- β-Amyrin

Names
- IUPAC names α: (3β)-Urs-12-en-3-ol β: (3β)-Olean-12-en-3-ol δ: (3β)-Olean-13(18)-en-3-ol
- Other names α: α-Amyrenol; α-Amirin; α-Amyrine; Urs-12-en-3β-ol; Viminalol β: β-Amyrenol; β-Amirin; β-Amyrine; Olean-12-en-3β-ol; 3β-Hydroxyolean-12-ene

Identifiers
CAS Number	638-95-9 (α); 559-70-6 (β); 508-04-3 (δ)
3D model (JSmol)	(α): Interactive image; (β): Interactive image
ChemSpider	65935 (α); 65921 (β); 26333109 (δ)
PubChem CID	73170 (α); 73145 (β); 12358447 (δ)
UNII	30ZAG40J8N (α); KM8353IPSO (β)
- InChI: InChI=1S/C30H50O/c1-19-11-14-27(5)17-18-29(7)21(25(27)20(19)2)9-10-23-28(6)15-13-24(31)26(3,4)22(28)12-16-30(23,29)8/h9,19-20,22-25,31H,10-18H2,1-8H3/t19-,20+,22+,23-,24+,25+,27-,28+,29-,30-/m1/s1 Key: FSLPMRQHCOLESF-SFMCKYFRSA-N; (β): InChI=1S/C30H50O/c1-25(2)15-16-27(5)17-18-29(7)20(21(27)19-25)9-10-23-28(6)13-12-24(31)26(3,4)22(28)11-14-30(23,29)8/h9,21-24,31H,10-19H2,1-8H3/t21-,22-,23+,24-,27+,28-,29+,30+/m0/s1 Key: JFSHUTJDVKUMTJ-QHPUVITPSA-N
- SMILES: (α): O[C@H]2CC[C@@]1([C@@H]3[C@](CC[C@H]1C2(C)C)(C)[C@]5(C(=C/C3)\[C@@H]4[C@@H](C)[C@H](C)CC[C@]4(C)CC5)C)C; (β): C[C@@]12CC[C@@]3(C(=CC[C@H]4[C@]3(CC[C@@H]5[C@@]4(CC[C@@H](C5(C)C)O)C)C)[C@@H]1CC(CC2)(C)C)C

Properties
Chemical formula	C_{30}H_{50}O
Molar mass	426.729 g·mol^{−1}
Melting point	α: 186 °C β: 197-187.5 °C
- Except where otherwise noted, data are given for materials in their standard state (at 25 °C [77 °F], 100 kPa). Infobox references

The amyrins are three closely related natural chemical compounds of the triterpene class. They are designated α-amyrin (ursane skeleton), β-amyrin (oleanane skeleton), and δ-amyrin. Each is a pentacyclic triterpenol with the chemical formula C_{30}H_{50}O. They are widely distributed in nature and have been isolated from a variety of plant sources such as epicuticular wax. In plant biosynthesis, α-amyrin is the precursor of ursolic acid and β-amyrin is the precursor of oleanolic acid. All three amyrins occur in the surface wax of tomato fruit. α-Amyrin is found in dandelion coffee.

A study demonstrated that α,β-amyrin exhibits long-lasting antinociceptive and anti-inflammatory properties in 2 models of persistent nociception via activation of the cannabinoid receptors CB1 and CB2 and by inhibiting the production of cytokines and expression of NF-κB, CREB, and cyclooxygenase 2.
