= Mandragora =

Mandragora may refer to:

== Biology ==
- Mandragora (genus), a plant genus in the nightshade family
  - Mandragora autumnalis, mandrake or autumn mandrake
  - Mandragora caulescens, Himalayan mandrake
  - Mandragora officinarum, mandrake or Mediterranean mandrake, the type species of the genus
  - Mandragora turcomanica, Turkmenian mandrake

== Arts and entertainment ==
- Mandragora (novel), 1991 novel by David McRobbie
- Mandragora (film), 1997 film by Wiktor Grodecki
- Mandragora (band), UK psychedelic rock band
- Mandragora Movies, Romanian film production company
- La Mandrágora, Chilean Surrealist group
- Mandragora, ballet by Karol Szymanowski
- The Masque of Mandragora, a serial in the BBC TV series Doctor Who

== Other uses ==
- Rolando Mandragora (born 1997), Italian footballer
- Mandragora (demon), familiar demons

== See also ==
- Mandrake (disambiguation)
