= Mandrake (disambiguation) =

Mandrake is a poisonous herbaceous plant in the genus Mandragora, often connected with magical rituals.

Mandrake may also refer to:

== Biology ==
- Mandragora (genus), a genus in the family Solanaceae, including
  - Mandragora autumnalis, mandrake or autumn mandrake (considered by some sources to be a synonym of Mandragora officinarum)
  - Mandragora caulescens, Himalayan mandrake
  - Mandragora officinarum, mandrake or Mediterranean mandrake
  - Mandragora turcomanica, Turkmenian mandrake
- Bryonia alba, English mandrake or white bryony
- Podophyllum peltatum, American mandrake, a North American plant in the family Berberidaceae

== Arts and entertainment ==
=== Film, television, and drama ===
- The Mandrake, a play by Niccolò Machiavelli first published in 1524
- The Mandrake (1965 film), a 1965 Franco-Italian film
- Mandrake (TV series), a Latin American TV series
- Mandrake (1979 film), an American television thriller film
- Mandrake, a 2010 television film with Andrew Stevens
- Mandrake, an Indian Malayalam-language film series, consisting of
  - Junior Mandrake (1997)
  - Senior Mandrake (2010)

=== Fictional characters ===
- Mandragora (demon), a supernatural being in folklore
- Mandrake, a short-lived mascot at the University of Oregon
- Mandrake the Magician, a comic strip character
- Caleb Mandrake, a character in The Skulls, a feature-length film by Rob Cohen
- Group Captain Lionel Mandrake, a character in Stanley Kubrick's film Dr. Strangelove
- John Mandrake (Nathaniel), a character from the Bartimaeus Trilogy
- Paolo Mandrake, the lawyer and amateur detective who is the protagonist of stories by Rubem Fonseca, and basis for the TV series
- Mandrake, a character in the animated feature Epic

=== Music ===
- "Mandrake", a 1976 song on Gong's Shamal
- Mandrake (album), a 2001 album by Edguy
- Mandrake (German band), a gothic metal band
- Mandrake (Japanese band), a progressive rock band
- The Mandrake (band), an American death metal band
- The Mandrake Project, a 2024 album by Bruce Dickinson

=== Literature and publishing ===
- Mandrake of Oxford, a small press
- Mandrake Press, a publishing company
- The Mandrake (Surrealist group), a 20th-century Chilean Surrealist group

== People ==
- Ed Mandrake (1938–2010), Canadian politician
- Leon Mandrake (1911–1993), magician
- Tom Mandrake (born 1956), comic book artist

== Other uses ==
- Mandrake Linux, former name of Mandriva Linux, a computer operating system
- Yakovlev Yak-25 (NATO designation: Mandrake), a Soviet aircraft
- Slang name for the recreational drug methaqualone

== See also ==
- Mandarake, a Japanese retail corporation
