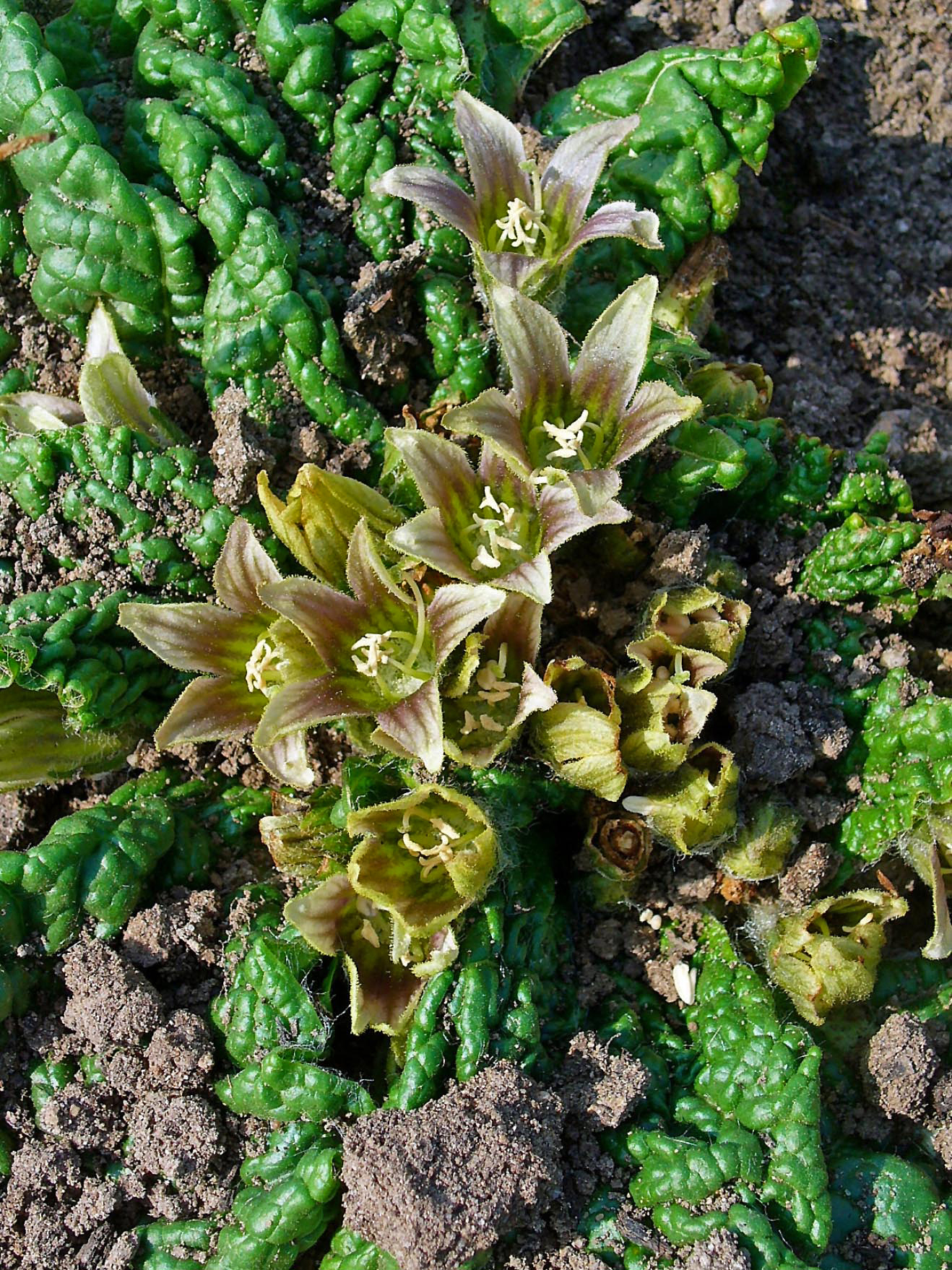

Conservation status
- Endangered (IUCN 3.1) (Europe assessment)

Scientific classification
- Kingdom: Plantae
- Clade: Tracheophytes
- Clade: Angiosperms
- Clade: Eudicots
- Clade: Asterids
- Order: Solanales
- Family: Solanaceae
- Genus: Mandragora
- Species: M. officinarum

Binomial name
- Mandragora officinarum L.

Synonyms
- (Based on a broad circumscription of M. officinarum): Atropa acaulis Stokes; Atropa humilis Salisb.; Atropa mandragora L., nom. illeg.; Mandragora acaulis Gaertn.; Mandragora autumnalis Bertol.; Mandragora foemina Garsault; Mandragora haussknechtii Heldr.; Mandragora hispanica Vierh.; Mandragora × hybrida Hausskn. & Heldr.; Mandragora mas Garsault; Mandragora microcarpa Bertol.; Mandragora neglecta G.Don ex Loudon; Mandragora praecox Sweet; Mandragora vernalis Bertol.

= Mandragora officinarum =

Species of plant

Mandragora officinarum is the type species of the plant genus Mandragora in the nightshade family Solanaceae. It is often known as mandrake, although this name is also used for other plants. As of 2015, sources differed significantly in the species they use for Mandragora plants native to the Mediterranean region. The main species found around the Mediterranean is called Mandragora autumnalis, the autumn mandrake. In a broader circumscription, all the plants native to the regions around the Mediterranean Sea are placed in M. officinarum, which thus includes M. autumnalis. The names autumn mandrake and Mediterranean mandrake are then used. Whatever the circumscription, Mandragora officinarum is a perennial herbaceous plant with ovate leaves arranged in a rosette, a thick upright root, often branched, and bell-shaped flowers followed by yellow or orange berries.

Because mandrakes contain deliriant hallucinogenic tropane alkaloids (atropine, scopolamine, and hyoscyamine) which cause delirium and hallucinations, and the shape of their roots often resembles human figures, they have been associated with a variety of religious and spiritual practices throughout history. They have long been used in magic rituals, today also in contemporary Pagan practices such as Wicca and Heathenry. However, the so-called "mandrakes" used in this way are not always species of Mandragora let alone Mandragora officinarum; for example, Bryonia alba, the English mandrake, is explicitly mentioned in some sources.

== Description ==
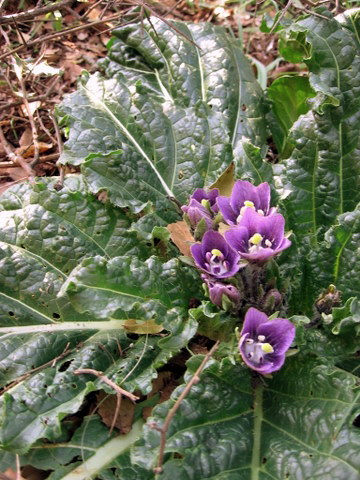
Mandragora plant from Israel that some sources would place in Mandragora autumnalis rather than Mandragora officinarum

As of 2015, Mandragora officinarum has three or four different circumscriptions (see Taxonomy below). The description below applies to a broad circumscription, used in a 1998 revision of the genus, in which the name is used for all the plants native to Mediterranean region. Thus defined, Mandragora officinarum is a very variable perennial herbaceous plant with a long thick root, often branched. It has almost no stem, the leaves being borne in a basal rosette. The leaves are very variable in size and shape, with a maximum length of 45 cm (18 in). They are usually either elliptical in shape or wider towards the end (obovate), with varying degrees of hairiness.

The flowers appear from autumn to spring (September to April). They are borne in the axils of the leaves. The flower stalks (pedicels) are also very variable in length, up to 45 cm (18 in) long. The five sepals are 6–28 mm (0.2–1.1 in) long, fused together at the base and then forming free lobes to about a half to two-thirds of their total length. The five petals are greenish white to pale blue or violet in colour, 12–65 mm (0.5–2.6 in) long, and, like the sepals, joined together at the base with free lobes at the end. The lobes are between half as long as the petals to almost as long. The five stamens are joined to the bases of the petals and vary in length from 7 to 15 mm (0.3 to 0.6 in). The anthers of the stamens are usually yellow or brown, but are sometimes pale blue.

The fruit which forms in late autumn to early summer (November to June) is a berry, shaped like a globe or an ellipsoid (i.e. longer than wide), with a very variable diameter of 5–40 mm (0.2–1.6 in). When ripe, the fruit is glossy, and yellow to orange – somewhat resembling a small tomato. It contains yellow to light brown seeds, 2.5–6 mm (0.10–0.24 in) long.

Earlier, a different circumscription was used, in which Mandragora officinarum referred only to plants found in northern Italy and part of the coast of former Yugoslavia, most Mediterranean mandrakes being placed in Mandragora autumnalis. The description above would then apply to both species combined, with M. officinarum having greenish-white rather than violet petals, up to 25 mm (1 in) long rather than usually 30–40 mm (1.2–1.6 in) or longer, and a berry that is globose rather than ellipsoid. More recently, plants native to the Levant have been separated out as Mandragora autumnalis, leaving those found in the rest of the Mediterranean area as M. officinarum. One difference then is that the size of the seeds of M. officinarum is less than half the size of those of M. autumnalis.

== Taxonomy ==
Mandragora officinarum was first described in 1753 by Carl Linnaeus in the first edition of Species Plantarum. It is the type species of the genus Mandragora. (Linnaeus later changed his mind and in 1759 placed M. officinarum in the genus Atropa as A. mandragora.) Linnaeus regarded M. officinarum as the sole species in the genus, at that time only known from the Mediterranean region. Jackson and Berry (1979) and Ungricht et al. (1998) have documented some of the subsequent confusion over the number of Mediterranean species of Mandragora and their scientific names. Ungricht et al. describe the confusion as "incredible" and a "morass".

The first confusion relates to the name "Mandragora officinalis Mill.", dated to 1768 in the eighth edition of Philip Miller's The gardener's dictionary. However, this work uses the epithet officinarum, not "officinalis". There is a reference to "Mandragora officinalis" as a synonym in the 9th edition of The gardener's dictionary of 1807. However, there was no such earlier use of the name, and Ungricht et al. say that "officinalis" is an orthographic error for the correct epithet officinarum, so that the name "Mandragora officinalis Mill." (and any subsequent uses of this epithet) have "no real nomenclatural standing".

The second confusion relates to the number of Mediterranean species of Mandragora (a confusion which continues). At different times, between one and five taxa have been recognized. Dioscorides was among those who distinguished between "male" and "female" mandrakes, a distinction used in 1764 when Garsault published the names Mandragora mas and Mandragora foemina. Flowering time was also used to distinguish species; thus in the 1820s, Antonio Bertoloni named two species as Mandragora vernalis, the spring-flowering mandrake, and Mandragora autumnalis, the autumn-flowering mandrake. Since the late 1990s, three main circumscriptions of Mandragora officinarum have been used and all three will be found in current sources.

- Identifying the spring-flowering mandrake as Linnaeus's M. officinarum, works such as Flora Europaea list two Mediterranean species of Mandragora: M. officinarum and M. autumnalis. On this view, the main Mediterranean species is M. autumnalis rather than M. officinarum, which is a rare species, confined to northern Italy and a small region of the coast of former Yugoslavia.
- Using statistical analysis of morphological characters, Ungricht et al. in 1998 found no distinct clusters among the specimens they examined and concluded that Linnaeus's M. officinarum is a single, variable species. They thus include M. autumnalis in M. officinarum, which on this view is the only Mediterranean mandrake.
- M. autumnalis was again separated from M. officinarum by Tu et al. in 2010 in a molecular phylogenetic study. They regard M. officinarum as the main species in the Mediterranean, but separate out plants native to the Levant as M. autumnalis, which was then shown to be more closely related to Mandragora turcomanica than to their circumscription of M. officinarum.

== Distribution and habitat ==
In the circumscription in which Mandragora officinarum is the only Mediterranean species, it is native to regions around the Mediterranean Sea, within the borders of Tunisia, Algeria and Morocco in north Africa; southern Spain, southern Portugal, Italy included Sardinia and Sicily, (Niccolò Machiavelli wrote the play La Mandragola (The Mandrake) about it), former Yugoslavia, Greece and Cyprus in southern Europe; southern Turkey; Syria, Lebanon, and the Palestine region in the Levant. It is usually found in open habitats, such as light woodland and disturbed sites, including olive groves, fallow land, waysides, railway embankments and ruins, from sea level to 1,200 m (3,900 ft).

When Mandragora autumnalis is regarded as the main Mediterranean species, M. officinarum is native only to north Italy and part of the coast of former Yugoslavia. Alternatively, M. officinarum is absent from the Levant, where it is replaced by M. autumnalis.

== Toxicity ==
All species of Mandragora contain highly biologically active alkaloids, tropane alkaloids in particular. Hanuš et al. reviewed the phytochemistry of Mandragora species. More than 80 substances have been identified; their paper gives the detailed chemical structure of 37 of them. Jackson and Berry were unable to find any differences in alkaloid composition between Mandragora officinarum (using the narrowest circumscription of this species) and Mandragora autumnalis (viewed as the main Mediterranean species). Alkaloids present in the fresh plant or the dried root included atropine, hyoscyamine, scopolamine (hyoscine), scopine, cuscohygrine, apoatropine, 3-alpha-tigloyloxytropane, 3-alpha,6-beta-ditigloyloxytropane and belladonnines. Non-alkaloid constituents included sitosterol and beta-methylesculetin (scopoletin).

The alkaloids make the plant, in particular the root and leaves, poisonous, via anticholinergic, hallucinogenic, and hypnotic effects. Anticholinergic properties can lead to asphyxiation. Ingesting mandrake root is likely to have other adverse effects such as vomiting and diarrhea. The alkaloid concentration varies between plant samples, and accidental poisoning is likely to occur. Clinical reports of the effects of consumption of Mandragora officinarum (as Mandragora autumnalis) include severe symptoms similar to those of atropine poisoning, including blurred vision, dilation of the pupils (mydriasis), dryness of the mouth, difficulty in urinating, dizziness, headache, vomiting, blushing and a rapid heart rate (tachycardia). Hyperactivity and hallucinations also occurred in the majority of patients.

== Medicinal use ==
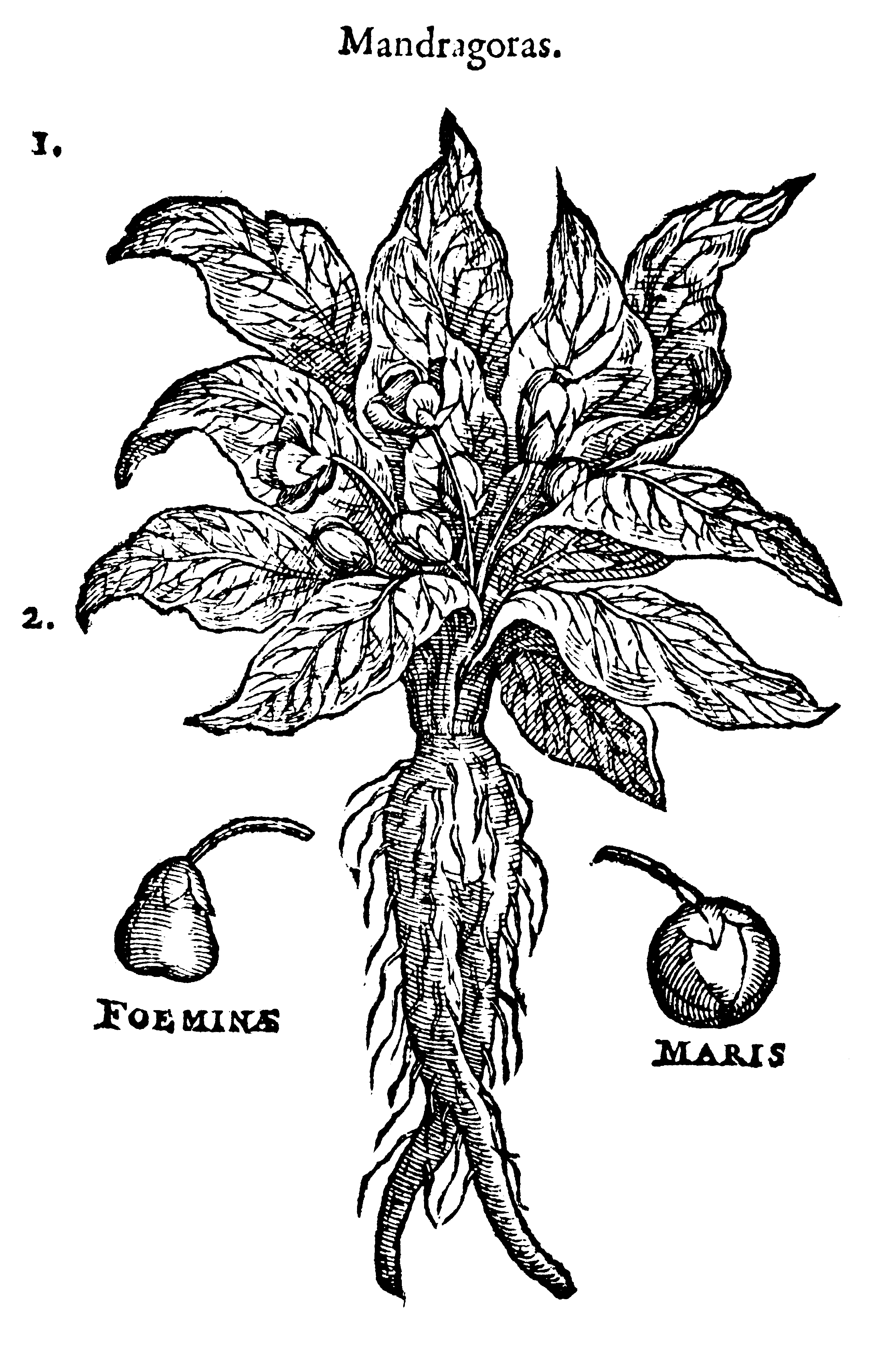
The so-called "female" and "male" mandrakes, from a 1583 illustration

Mandrake has a long history of medicinal use, although superstition has played a large part in the uses to which it has been applied. WebMD, which categorises the herb European Mandrake derived from Mandragora officinarum under the heading "Vitamins & Supplements", declares that it is UNSAFE for anyone to use European mandrake for medicinal purposes. In the UK, The Prescription Only Medicines (Human Use) Order 1997, in its Schedule 1, identifies "Mandragora autumnalis" as a substance which, if included in medicinal products, makes those products prescription only medicines, and therefore only prescribable by those categories of appropriate practitioners specified in Regulation 214 of The Human Medicines Regulations 2012. Medical herbalists are not recognised as "appropriate practitioners" under this legislation. As of 2019, Mandragora autumnalis Bertol. is an accepted species distinguishable from Mandragora officinarum L., so it follows that mandrake preparations and products derived from Mandragora officinarum L. may not actually be covered by this UK legislation. However, the European Medicines Agency, which oversees the registration of herbal medicinal products in the European Union, does not recognise mandrake, and indeed any Mandragora species, as an approved herbal medicinal product, substance, or preparation under the European Directive on Traditional Herbal Medicinal Products.

The root is hallucinogenic and narcotic. In sufficient quantities, it induces a state of unconsciousness and was used as an anaesthetic for surgery in ancient times. In the past, juice from the finely grated root was applied externally to relieve rheumatic pains. It was also used internally to treat melancholy, convulsions, and mania. When taken internally in large doses, however, it is said to excite delirium and madness.

In the past, mandrake was often made into amulets which were believed to bring good fortune and cure sterility. In one superstition, people who pull up this root will be condemned to hell, and the mandrake root would scream as it was pulled from the ground, killing anyone who heard it. Therefore, in the past, people have tied the roots to the bodies of animals and then used these animals to pull the roots from the soil. In ancient Rome, it was used as a painkiller during surgery.
