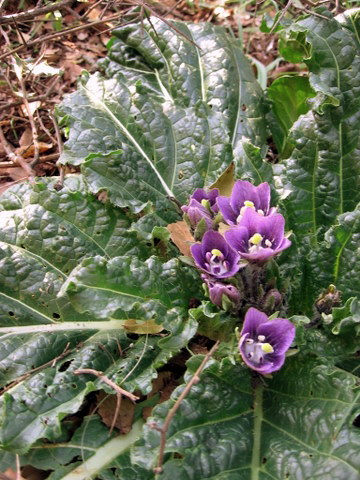
- Photographed in Israel

Conservation status
- Least Concern (IUCN 3.1)

Scientific classification
- Kingdom: Plantae
- Clade: Tracheophytes
- Clade: Angiosperms
- Clade: Eudicots
- Clade: Asterids
- Order: Solanales
- Family: Solanaceae
- Genus: Mandragora
- Species: M. autumnalis

Binomial name
- Mandragora autumnalis Bertol.

= Mandragora autumnalis =

Species of plant

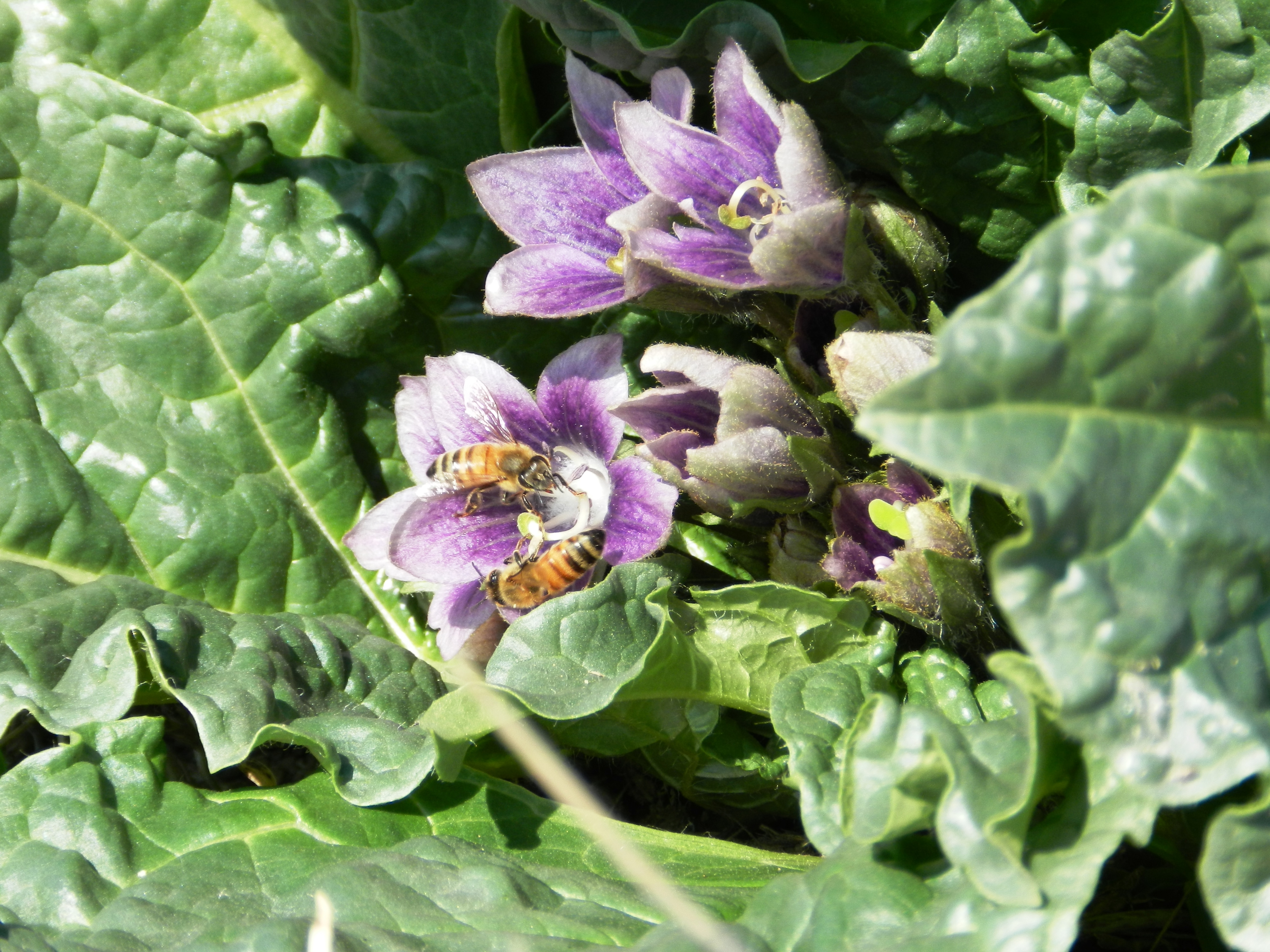
Closer view of the flowers

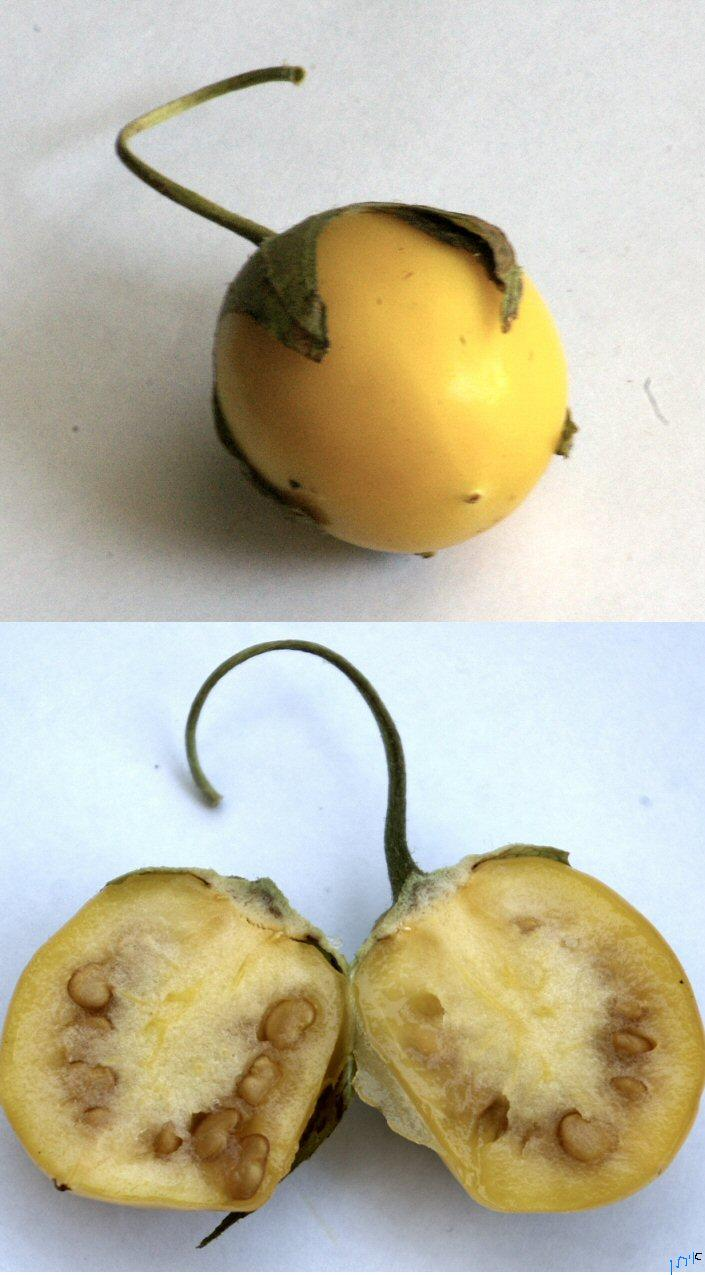
Ripening fruit

Mandragora autumnalis, known as mandrake or autumn mandrake, is recognized by some sources as a separate species from Mandragora officinarum, although with different circumscriptions. Others regard it as merely part of this very variable species. Plants given the name Mandragora autumnalis consist of a rosette of leaves up to 60 cm (2 ft) across, close to the ground, with a central group of usually purplish flowers followed by yellow or orange berries. The large tap-roots as well as the leaves contain alkaloids and are toxic. They have traditional uses as herbal medicines.

== Description ==
The boundary between the two species Mandragora autumnalis and Mandragora officinarum varies among authors, with some regarding them as the same species (see § Taxonomy below). Whatever distinction is used, plants of M. autumnalis are herbaceous perennials, with a large upright tap-root, often branched and sometimes shaped somewhat like a person. There is little or no stem, the leaves being borne in a basal rosette up to 60 cm (2 ft) across. The flowers are clustered at the centre of the rosette, each with five sepals, five petals and five stamens. Both the sepals and petals are fused at the base forming two five-lobed bell-shaped cups. The ovary has two chambers (locules) and a long style. The fruit is a fleshy berry with many seeds.

For those authors who regard Mandragora autumnalis as the main species found around the Mediterranean, it has flowers varying in colour but typically violet or purple, 30–40 mm (1–2 in) long, and berries that are yellow or orange and egg-shaped, while the much less widespread Mandragora officinarum has somewhat smaller flowers, greenish-white in colour, and berries that are yellow and globe-shaped. Those who regard M. officinarum as the main species found around the Mediterranean, with M. autumnalis being found only in the Levant, use the size of the seeds as one of the distinguishing factors, those of M. autumnalis being more than twice the size of those of M. officinarum. In the Palestine region, where the native taxon is M. autumnalis in both approaches, it flowers between December and February, i.e. not only in the autumn as the specific epithet might suggest.

== Taxonomy ==
In 1753, in the first edition of Species Plantarum, Carl Linnaeus described a single species, Mandragora officinarum, for plants found around the Mediterranean. Jackson and Berry (1979) and Ungricht et al. (1998) have documented the subsequent confusion over the number of Mediterranean species of Mandragora and their scientific names. Antonio Bertoloni used flowering time to name two species: Mandragora autumnalis, the autumn-flowering mandrake, in 1820, and Mandragora vernalis, the spring-flowering mandrake, in 1824. M. vernalis is considered to be the same as Linnaeus's M. officinarum. Three interpretations of Mandragora autumnalis are in use:

- Works such as Flora Europaea list two Mediterranean species of Mandragora: M. officinarum and M. autumnalis. M. autumnalis is used for most plants, with M. officinarum confined to north Italy and former Yugoslavia. With this circumscription, M. autumnalis is the main species of mandrake found around the Mediterranean.
- Using statistical analysis of morphological characters, Ungricht et al. found no distinct clusters among the Mediterranean specimens they examined and concluded that Linnaeus's M. officinarum is a single, variable species. On this view, M. autumnalis is a synonym for M. officinarum and not a distinct species in its own right.
- Other sources continue to divide Linnaeus's M. officinarum into two species, but differently. Plants from the western Mediterranean, from Turkey westwards to the Iberian peninsula and Morocco, are placed in M. officinarum; plants from the eastern Mediterranean, the Levant, are placed in M. autumnalis. One difference between the two species thus circumscribed is that seeds of M. autumnalis are more than twice the size of those of M. officinarum. A molecular phylogenetic study found that when defined in this way, M. autumnalis is closely related to Mandragora turcomanica.

== Distribution ==
In one treatment, Mandragora autumnalis is the main species of Mandragora found all around the Mediterranean, in Tunisia, Algeria, Morocco, southern Portugal, southern Spain, southern Italy, Greece, Cyprus, Turkey, Syria, Lebanon, Israel, Palestine, and Jordan, being absent in northern Italy and a region on the coast of former Yugoslavia, where it is replaced by M. officinarum. In another treatment, Mandragora autumnalis is native only to the Levant (from Syria south to Israel and Palestine), the species found elsewhere around the Mediterranean being M. officinarum.

== Toxicity and use ==
All species of Mandragora contain highly biologically active alkaloids, tropane alkaloids in particular. Jackson and Berry were unable to find any differences in the composition of these chemicals between Mandragora autumnalis and Mandragora officinarum (using the broader definition of M. autumnalis). Alkaloids present included hyoscyamine, hyoscine, cuscohygrine, apoatropine, 3-alpha-tigloyloxytropane, 3-alpha,6-beta-ditigloyloxytropane and belladonnine. Non-alkaloid constituents included sitosterol and beta-methylesculetin (scopoletin).

The alkaloids make the plant, particularly the root and leaves, poisonous. Clinical reports of the effects of consumption of Mandragora autumnalis include severe symptoms similar to those of atropine poisoning, including blurred vision, dilation of the pupils (mydriasis), dryness of the mouth, difficulty in urinating, dizziness, headache, vomiting, blushing and a rapid heart rate (tachycardia). Hyperactivity and hallucinations also occurred in the majority of patients.

Mandragora species have a long use in traditional medicine, an extract being used for its real or supposed aphrodisiac, hypnotic, emetic, purgative, sedative and pain-killing effects. Tropane alkaloids are known to be effective as analgesics and anaesthetics, and can be used to increase circulation and dilate pupils, among other effects. Continued use of M. autumnalis in folk medicine was reported in Sicily in 2014.
