= C8H13NO2 =

The molecular formula C_{8}H_{13}NO_{2} (molar mass: 155.19 g/mol, exact mass: 155.0946 u) may refer to:

- Arecoline
- Bemegride
- Scopine
- Retronecine
