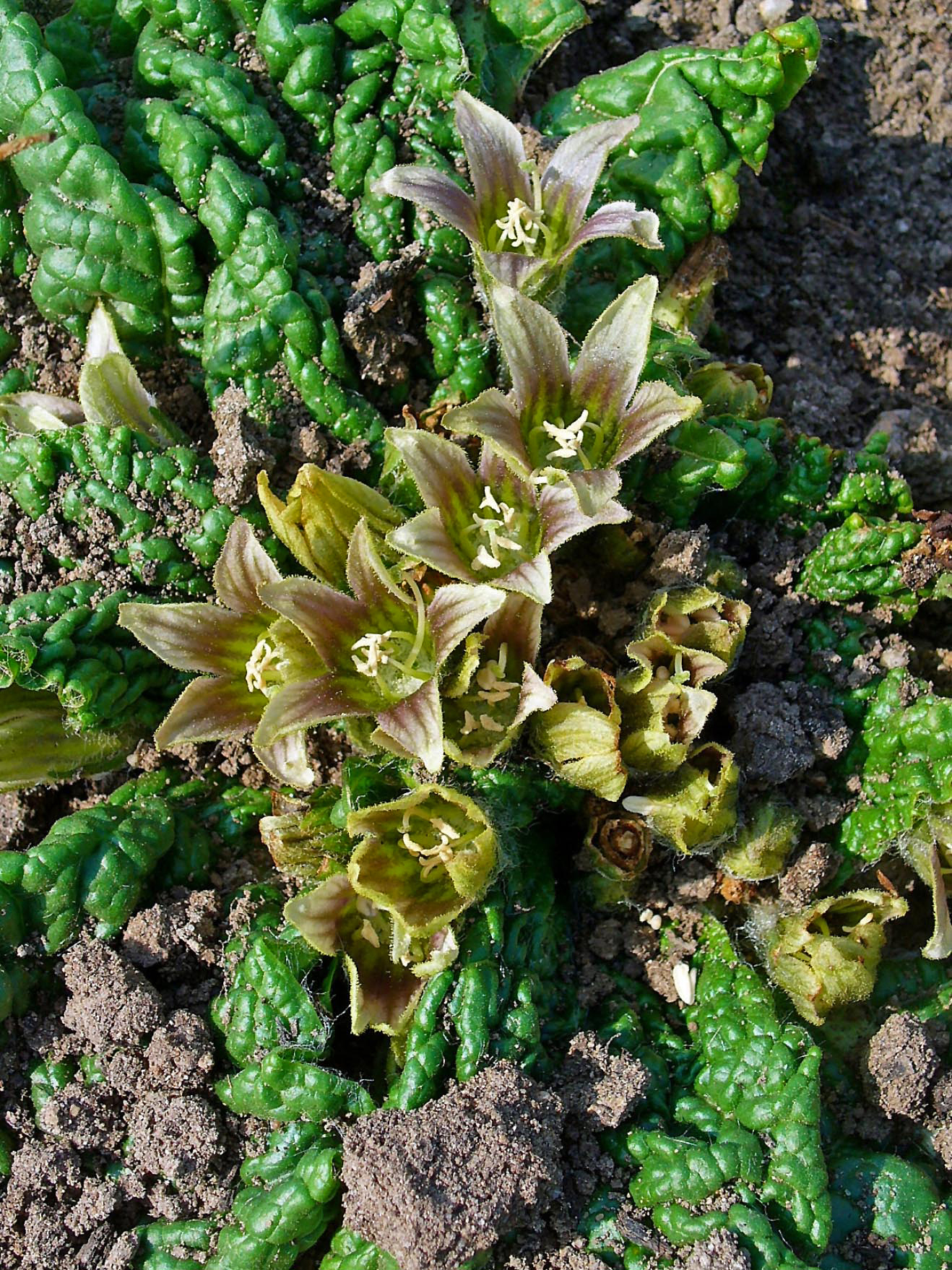
- Mandragora officinarum

Scientific classification
- Kingdom: Plantae
- Clade: Embryophytes
- Clade: Tracheophytes
- Clade: Angiosperms
- Clade: Eudicots
- Clade: Asterids
- Order: Solanales
- Family: Solanaceae
- Subfamily: Solanoideae
- Tribe: Mandragoreae
- Genus: Mandragora; L.

Species
- See text

= Mandragora (genus) =

Genus of plants

Mandragora is a plant genus belonging to the nightshade family (Solanaceae). Members of the genus are known as mandrakes. Between three and five species are placed in the genus. The one or two species found around the Mediterranean constitute the mandrake of ancient writers such as Dioscorides. Two or three further species are found eastwards into China. All are perennial herbaceous plants, with large tap roots and leaves in the form of a rosette. Individual flowers are bell-shaped, whitish through to violet, and followed by yellow or orange berries.

Like many members of the Solanaceae, species of Mandragora contain highly biologically active alkaloids that make the plants poisonous. Their roots in particular have a long use in traditional medicine. Mandrakes are involved in many myths and superstitions.

== Description ==
Species of Mandragora are perennial herbaceous plants. They have large vertical tap roots, sometimes forked. Their stems are short or virtually absent. The leaves form a rosette at the base of the plant. The flowers are sometimes borne on a short stalk (scape), and are solitary, with whorls of five parts. The sepals are joined at the base, as are the petals, both in the shape of a lobed bell. The stamens are shorter than the petals, joined to the floral tube towards the base. The ovary has two chambers (locules). After fertilization, a yellow or orange fruit forms (botanically a berry).

== Taxonomy ==
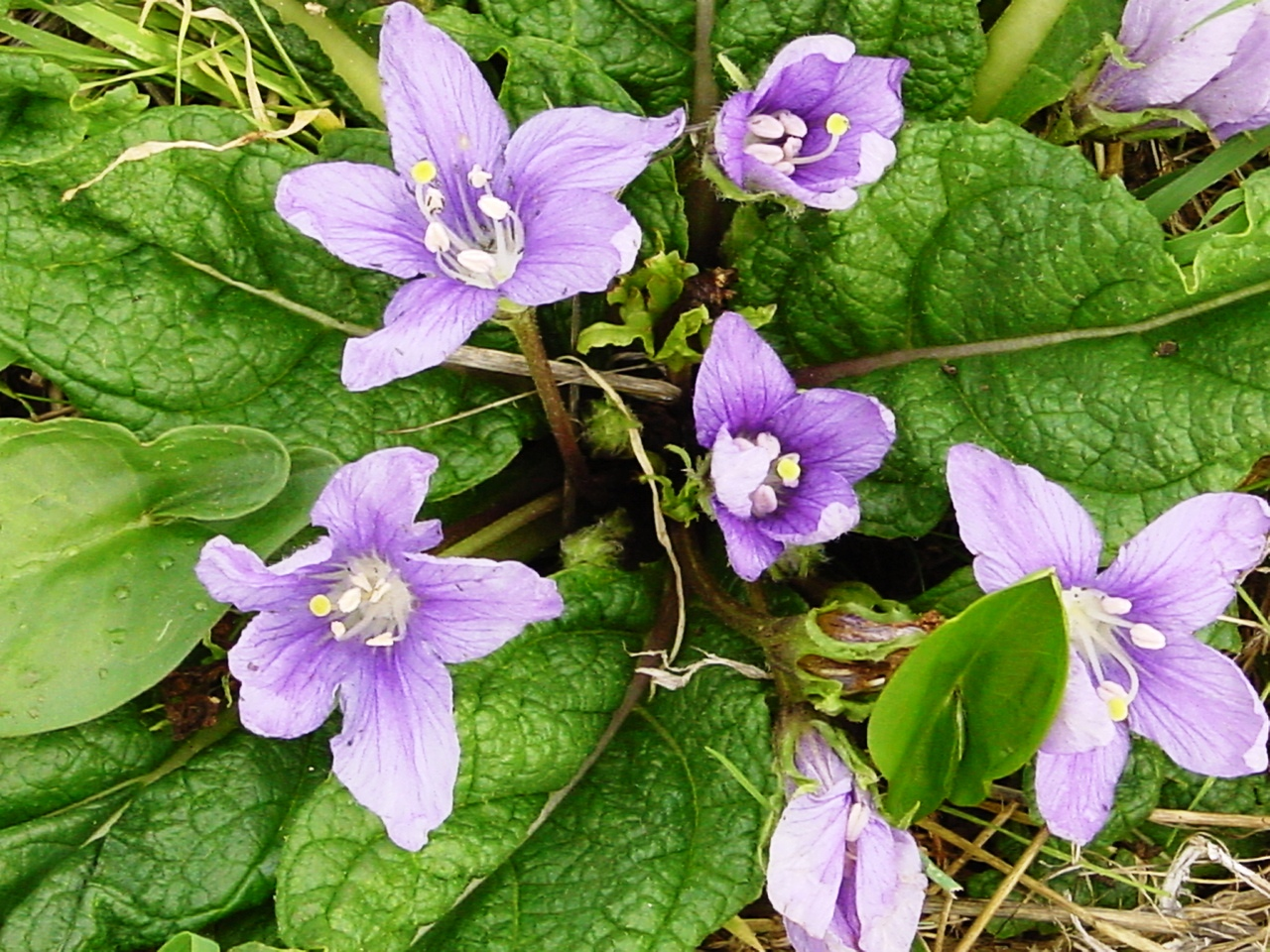
Mandragora officinarum with violet flowers

The genus Mandragora was first used in 1753 by Carl Linnaeus in the first edition of Species Plantarum where the Mediterranean species Mandragora officinarum was described, which is thus the type species of the genus. (Linnaeus later changed his mind and in 1759 placed M. officinarum in the genus Atropa as A. mandragora.)

Jackson and Berry (1979) and Ungricht et al. (1998) have documented the subsequent confusion over the number of Mediterranean species of Mandragora and their scientific names. Dioscorides was among those who distinguished between "male" and "female" mandrakes, a distinction used in 1764 when Garsault published the names Mandragora mas and Mandragora foemina. The size and shape of the fruit and the colour and time of appearance of the flowers have been used to distinguish possible species. In the 1820s, Antonio Bertoloni used flowering time to name two species as Mandragora vernalis, the spring-flowering mandrake, and Mandragora autumnalis, the autumn-flowering mandrake. Identifying the former as Linnaeus's M. officinarum, works such as Flora Europaea listed two Mediterranean species of Mandragora: M. officinarum and M. autumnalis. Using statistical analysis of morphological characters, Ungricht et al. found no distinct clusters among the specimens they examined and concluded that Linnaeus's M. officinarum is a single, variable species. Other sources divide M. officinarum sensu lato differently. Plants from the western Mediterranean, from Turkey westwards to the Iberian peninsula and Morocco, are placed in M. officinarum; plants from the eastern Mediterranean, from Syria to Israel, are placed in M. autumnalis.

=== Classification and phylogeny ===
Traditionally, Mandragora has been considered to be closely related to Atropa and Lycium, being grouped together in the same tribe or subtribe as at least the first of these genera. Molecular phylogenetic studies suggest that the genus belongs in the large subfamily Solanoideae, but that within this subfamily, it is one of a number of isolated genera with no immediate relatives. It has thus been placed in its own tribe, Mandragoreae.

Within the genus, studies have used different circumscriptions of the Mediterranean mandrakes. Two studies that separate plants found in the Levant (Mandragora autumnalis) from those found in the rest of the Mediterranean area (Mandragora officinarum) suggest that there are two clades in the genus - one based in the Mediterranean and beyond to Turkmenistan and Iran, and one in the Sino-Himalayan region. A simplified cladogram based on these studies is shown below. In one of the studies, M. chinghaiensis was embedded within M. caulescens.

- Mandragoreae
  - - - Mandragora turcomanica
      - Mandragora autumnalis
    - Mandragora officinarum
  - - Mandragora caulescens
    - Mandragora chinghaiensis

The Solanaceae are primarily a New World family. Mandragora is suggested to have originated around 20 million years ago, arriving in Eurasia through the agency of birds, with the main split between the species occurring around 10 million years ago.

=== Species ===
As of March 2015, major online plant databases (such as Tropicos, The Plant List, and GRIN Taxonomy for Plants) accept different numbers of species in the genus Mandragora. Three species are accepted in a 1998 review of the genus and by GRIN. Other sources keep M. autumnalis and M. chinghaiensis as separate species.

- Mandragora officinarum L. and Mandragora autumnalis Bertol.
  Central and southern Portugal and throughout the Mediterranean area, eastwards to Syria and Jordan. Virtually stemless; petals 1.2–6.5 cm (0.5–2.6 in) long, greenish white through blue to violet; berry globose to ovoid, yellow to orange when ripe.
  M. autumnalis may be included within M. officinarum or considered a separate species. Older sources consider M. autumnalis to the main species found in the Mediterranean with M. officinarum confined to northern Italy and parts of the coast of former Yugoslavia. Some more recent sources distinguish plants found in the Levant as Mandragora autumnalis, one difference being that the seeds are more than twice as large as those of M. officinarum.
- Mandragora turcomanica Mizg.
  Turkmenistan, Iran (Golestan Province). Stemless; petals 2.3–2.7 cm (0.9–1.1 in) long, violet; berry yellow, strongly aromatic.
- Mandragora caulescens C.B.Clarke (including Mandragora chinghaiensis Kuang & A.M.Lu, Mandragora tibetica Grubov)
  India, Nepal, Bhutan and parts of China (south-east Qinghai, west Sichuan, east Xizang (Tibet), north-west Yunnan). Stems sometimes present; petals dark purple or yellow; berry globose. Considerably variable in size and appearance, possibly justifying dividing the taxon into subspecies or even species.

== Toxicity ==
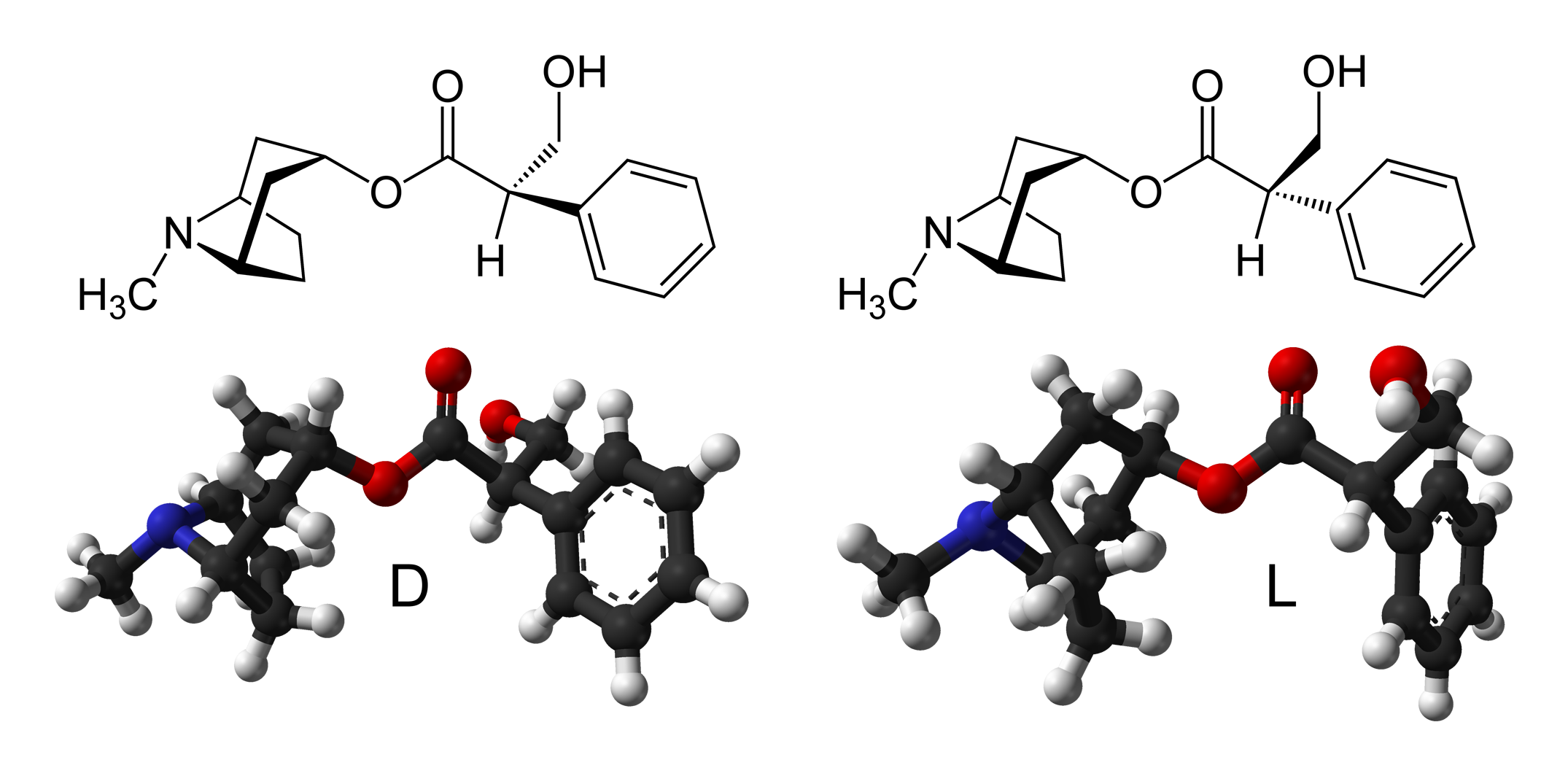
Atropine is a mixture of D and L isomers, the L isomer being hyoscyamine.

Like many members of the Solanaceae, species of Mandragora contain highly biologically active alkaloids, tropane alkaloids in particular. Hanuš et al. reviewed the phytochemistry of Mandragora species. More than 80 substances have been identified; their paper gives the detailed chemical structure of 37 of them. The different parts of the plant contain different proportions and concentrations of alkaloids, with the roots having the highest concentrations. Alkaloids present include atropine, apoatropine, belladonnine, cuscohygrine, hyoscyamine, scopolamine (hyoscine), 3α-tigloyloxytropane, and 3α,6β-ditigloyloxytropane. M. caulescens and M. turcomanica are also reported to contain anisodamine.

Clinical reports of the effects of consumption of plants described as M. autumnalis (M. offinarum sensu lato) include severe symptoms similar to those of atropine poisoning, including blurred vision, dilation of the pupils (mydriasis), dryness of the mouth, difficulty in urinating, dizziness, headache, vomiting, blushing, and a rapid heart rate (tachycardia). Hyperactivity and hallucinations also occurred in the majority of patients.

== Uses ==
Mandragora species have a long use in traditional medicine, extracts being used for their real or supposed aphrodisiac, hypnotic, emetic, purgative, sedative, and pain-killing effects. Tropane alkaloids are known to be effective as analgesics and anaesthetics, and can be used to increase circulation and dilate pupils, among other effects. Hyoscine and anisodamine are used medicinally in China. Continued use of M. autumnalis in folk medicine was reported in Sicily in 2014. M. caulescens (as M. chinghaiensis) has been listed as a Chinese medicinal plant needing conservation.

The presence of deliriant and hallucinogenic alkaloids and the sometimes vaguely humanoid shape of their roots have led to mandrakes being associated with a variety of myths and superstitious practices throughout history. However, the plants used in this way are not always species of Mandragora; for example, bryony (Bryonia) is explicitly mentioned as the source of a "mandrake" or "mandragora" in some sources.
