= C17H21NO2 =

The molecular formula C_{17}H_{21}NO_{2} (molar mass: 271.35 g/mol, exact mass: 271.1572 u) may refer to:

- Apoatropine
- Desomorphine
- Nisoxetine
