= C17H21NO5 =

The molecular formula C_{17}H_{21}NO_{5} (molar mass: 319.35 g/mol, exact mass: 319.1420 u) may refer to:

- Anisodine, also known as daturamine and α-hydroxyscopolamin
- Salicylmethylecgonine (2′-Hydroxycocaine)
