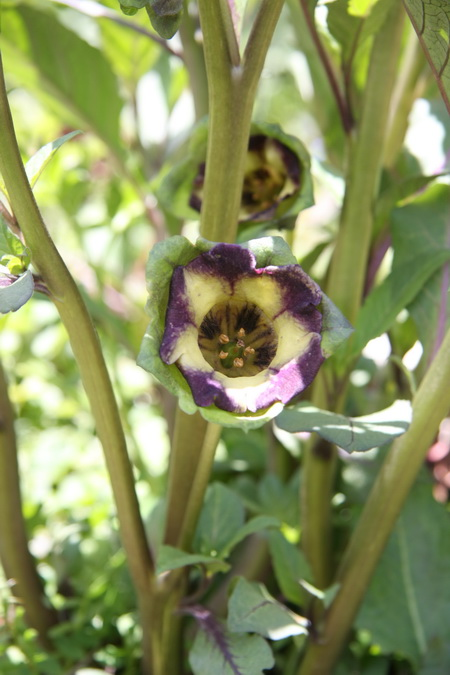

Scientific classification
- Kingdom: Plantae
- Clade: Tracheophytes
- Clade: Angiosperms
- Clade: Eudicots
- Clade: Asterids
- Order: Solanales
- Family: Solanaceae
- Genus: Anisodus
- Species: A. tanguticus

Binomial name
- Anisodus tanguticus (Maxim.) Pascher

Synonyms
- Homotypic Synonyms: Scopolia tangutica Maxim.; Scopolina tangutica (Maxim.) Kuntze; Whitleya tangutica (Maxim.) Sandina; Heterotypic Synonyms: Anisodus tanguticus var. viridulus C.Y.Wu & C.Chen

= Anisodus tanguticus =

Species of plant

Anisodus tanguticus (ཐང་ཕྲོམ་ནག་པོ། in Tibetan) is a species of flowering plant belonging to tribe Hyoscyameae of subfamily Solanoideae of the nightshade family Solanaceae. It is thus closely related to Henbane and Deadly Nightshade. Solanaceae is a plant family which includes many important agricultural plants such as the potato and the tomato. It is mostly found growing in the Qinghai-Tibetan Plateau. A. tanguticus is collected and used mostly for its medicinal effects caused by the plant's biologically active nicotine and tropane alkaloids. It has a significant impact in China as one of the 50 fundamental herbs used in traditional Chinese medicine.

== Scientific name ==
The generic name Anisodus is a compound of the Greek words ἄνισος (ánisos, 'unequal') and ὀδούς (odoús, 'tooth'), hence signifying 'having teeth of different lengths' – so called from the observation that certain species have calyces featuring lobes or teeth of unequal length. The specific name tanguticus is a geographical epithet, signifying 'belonging to the Tangut region' i.e. 'growing in the land of the Tangut people' – which includes the region of Amdo, one of the three traditional regions of Tibet (taking in the modern Chinese province of Qinghai and part of the south of the modern Chinese province of Gansu). Historically, the Tangut, or Western Xia empire included, at its greatest extent, also parts of what are now the Chinese provinces of Ningxia, northern Shaanxi, northeastern Xinjiang, southwestern Inner Mongolia and southernmost Outer Mongolia – all of which in fact lie outside the range of Anisodus tanguticus.

== Alternative names ==
Anisodus tanguticus is more commonly known in China as 山莨菪 (shān làngdàng = 'mountain henbane') or Zang Qie (transliterated also Tsang-ch'ieh).

== Description ==
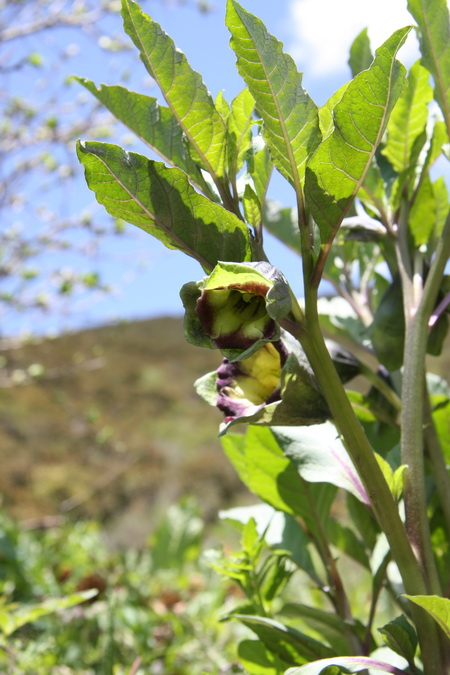
Anisodus tanguticus

Anisodus tanguticus is a perennial plant. It has flowers that are mostly solitary and borne in leaf axils. The flowers are mostly cup-shaped and radial. Most of them are nodding but they can sometimes become erect.

The pedicels are of variable length, averaging around 1.5–11 centimetres (0.6–4.3 in) and may be either glabrous or pubescent.

The calyx is usually broadly infundibuliform (funnel-shaped) and around 2.5–4 cm (1.0–1.6 in) in length.

Most of the calyx lobes of A. tanguticus appear broadly dentate. Closer examination of these lobes generally reveals one or two lobes to be broader and longer than the others. The apices of these lobes may be either acute or obtuse and the lobes themselves are slightly unequal and glabrous.

The infundibuliform corolla ranges in colour through varying shades and zonations of purple through to occasional wholly pale yellow to green forms, the individual petals making up the corolla reaching between 2.5 to 4 cm (1.0–1.6 in) in length.

The stamens are inserted at the base of the corolla tube and are half the length of the corolla. The filaments are about 0.8 cm (0.3 in) long and are hairless.

The anthers are oblong in shape and around 5–6 mm (0.20–0.24 in) in length, dehiscing longitudinally at maturity.

The ovary is conical, bearing styles that are approximately 1.2 cm (0.5 in) long. The stigma is discoidal and somewhat dehiscent at maturity.

Insect pollinators of the plant include flies, honeybees, and ants.

== Distribution ==
Anisodus tanguticus is found growing (on grassy sunny slopes) principally on the Tibetan Plateau, its range extending from the Hengduan Mountains of Sichuan and Yunnan in the east, through Qinghai and Gansu to the northwest, Tibet in the west, and Nepal in the south. It is present from altitudes of 2,800 to 4,200 metres (9,200–13,800 ft). Populations of A. tanguticus in this region have decreased significantly due to extensive harvesting of the species for medicinal purposes, resulting (since the roots are the part harvested) in the removal of plants in their entirety.

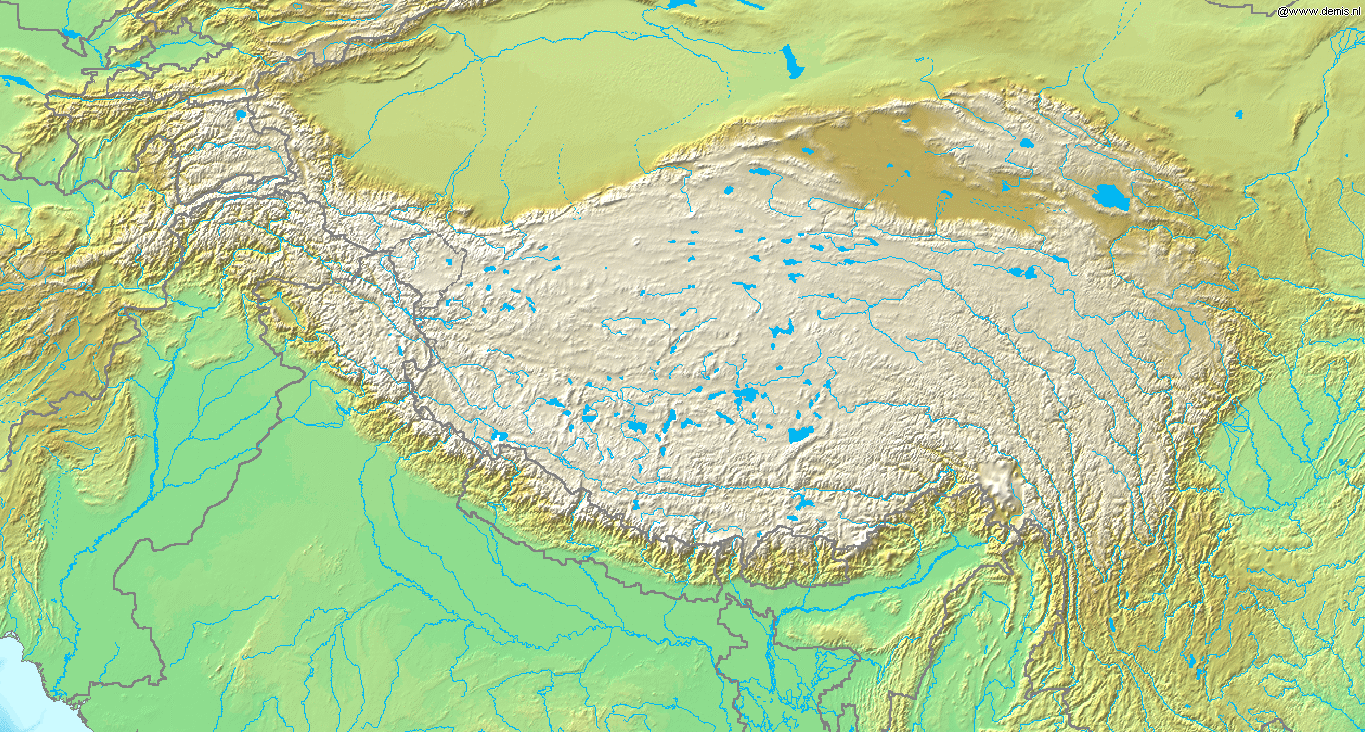
Distribution of A. tanguticus

Due to its distribution on the Tibetan Plateau, which includes many mountains and valleys, A. tanguticus can be found in very isolated areas relative to another patch of the same plant. This has led to a high level of genetic differentiation of A. tanguticus.

It is frequently found growing in the vicinity of settlements and monasteries, thriving as it does in soils nutrient-rich through the regular depositing of horse and cattle dung.

== Traditional medicine ==
Anisodus tanguticus (Chinese: 山莨菪; pinyin: shān làng dàng) is one of the 50 fundamental herbs used in traditional Chinese medicine.

It contains high levels of the tropane alkaloids hyoscyamine and scopolamine, which affect primarily the parasympathetic nervous system and can act as anticholinergic agents.

== Pharmaceutical use ==
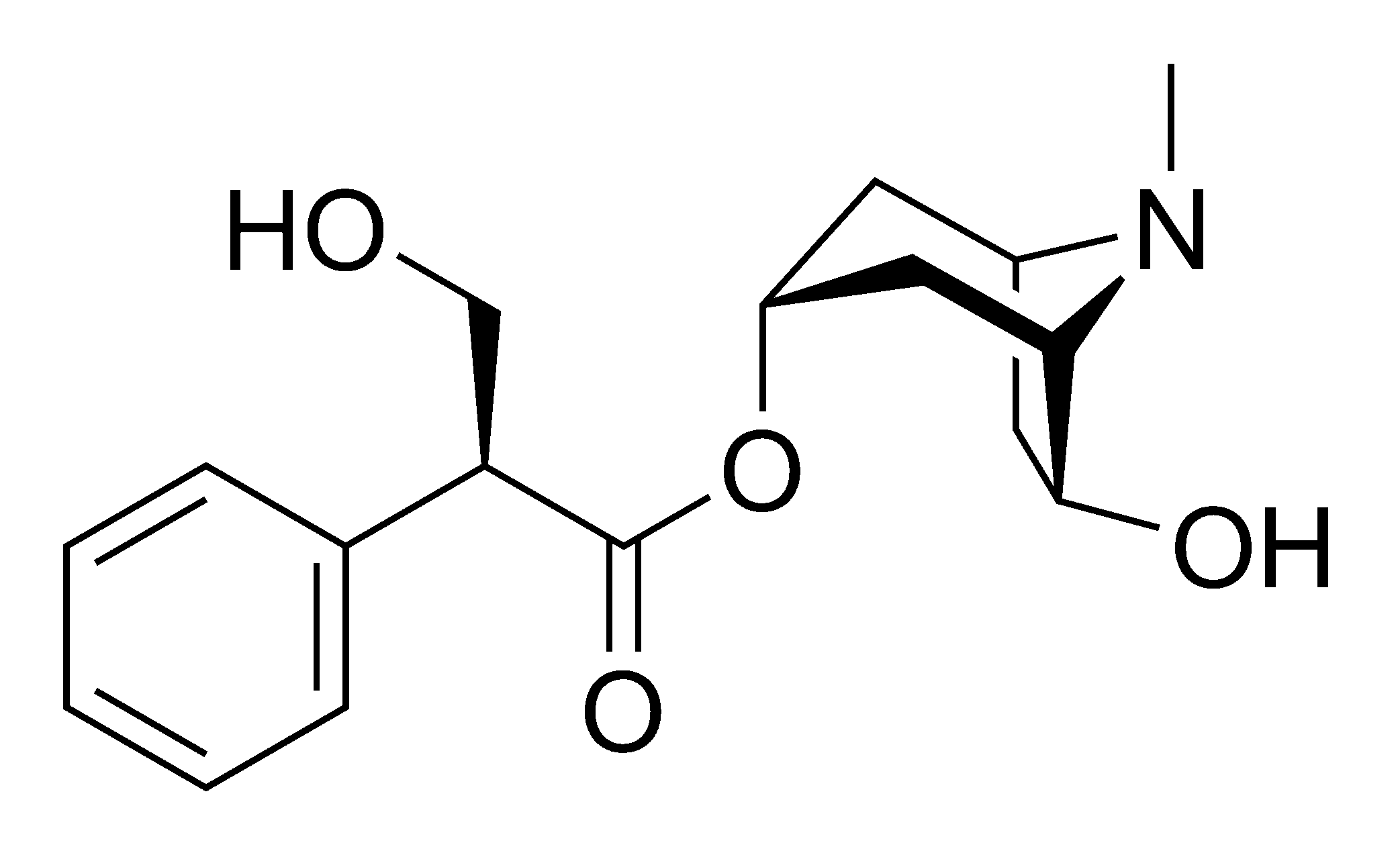
Anisodamine chemical structure

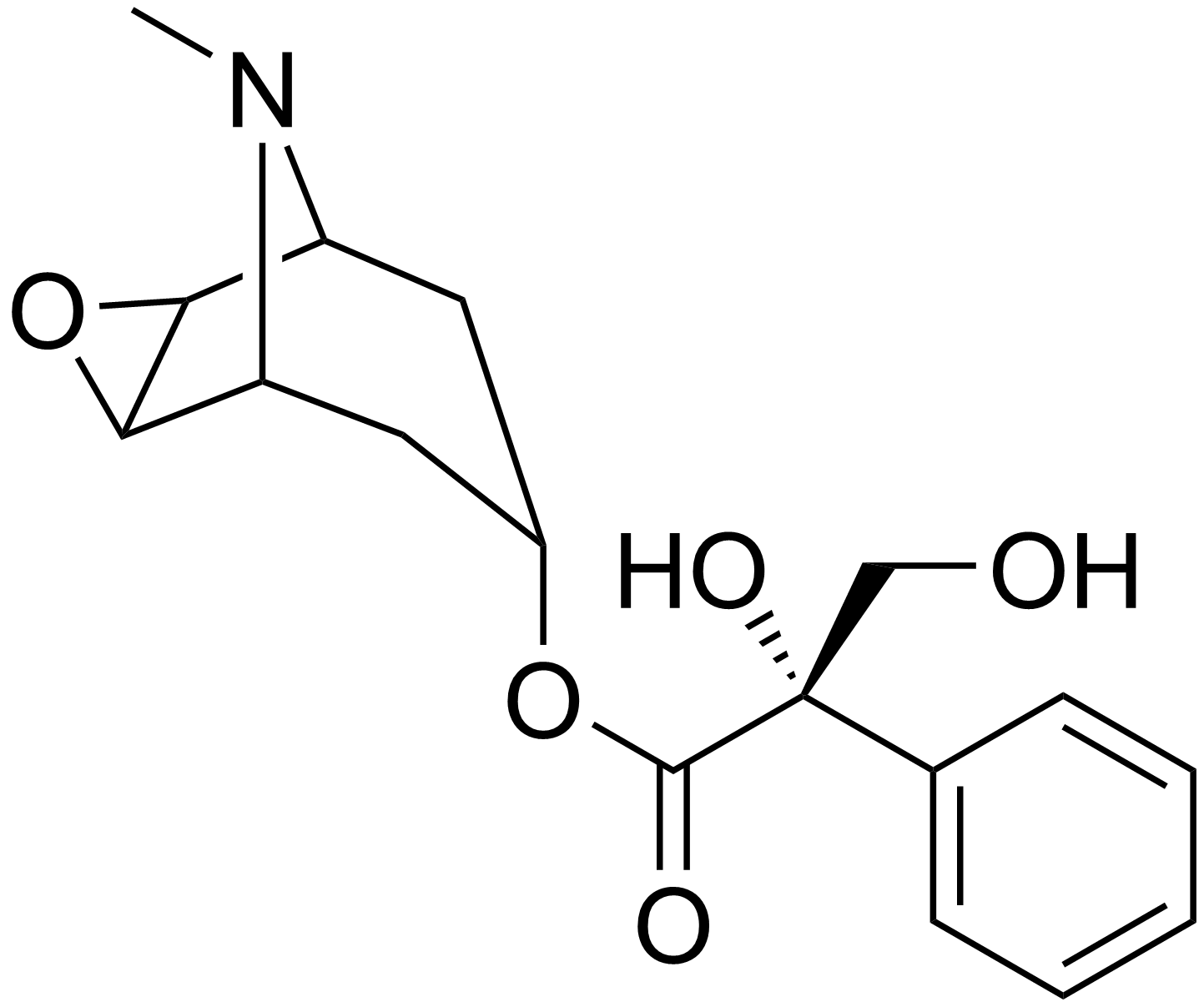
Anisodine chemical structure

Anisodus tanguticus is grown and harvested in order to extract two alkaloids, anisodamine and anisodine, which can be obtained from the roots of the plant. These alkaloids are used as anticholinergic drugs in China for acute circulatory shock. Anisodamine in particular was introduced into clinical use in China in 1965 through the manufacture of a synthetic drug that concentrated the alkaloids from the plant. It was first used to treat epidemic meningitis, but was later used to treat other ailments, including glomerulonephritis, rheumatoid arthritis, hemorrhagic necrotic enteritis, eclampsia, pulmonary edema, and circulatory shock. Anisodamine has also been found to be highly beneficial in cases of noise-induced hearing loss, dilating the capillaries and improving microcirculation in the bony labyrinth; while Anisodine has been used clinically for migraine and diseases of the fundus occuli due to vasospasm.

== Attempts to increase population ==
The population of A. tanguticus is starting to dwindle in its main habitat of the Qinghai-Tibet Plateau of China. This can be attributed not only to the effects of over-collection, as a medicinal species, but also to a low rate of seed germination in A. tanguticus – even under most natural conditions. This is probably due to the relative impermeability of the testa of its seeds which tends to prevent water absorption and acts also to inhibit gaseous exchange. The seeds of A. tanguticus are therefore classified as having coat-imposed dormancy.

A study was conducted in an effort to find the most effective method of breaking seed dormancy in the species in order to increase rates of germination. Several combinations of treatments (which included chilling, gibberellic acid, and mechanical scarification) were employed.

The mechanical scarification method (which involves the breaking, scratching, or softening of the seed coat) was found to be the only way to increase germination. The rate improved to about 70% and the germination time was improved to 4.1 days.

The study was undertaken in an effort to find ways of increasing the population of the plant.
