= Mandragora turcomanica =

Scientific classification
- Kingdom: Plantae
- Clade: Tracheophytes
- Clade: Angiosperms
- Clade: Eudicots
- Clade: Asterids
- Order: Solanales
- Family: Solanaceae
- Genus: Mandragora
- Species: M. turcomanica

Binomial name
- Mandragora turcomanica Mizg.

Species of plant

Mandragora turcomanica, the Turkmenian mandrake, is a perennial herbaceous plant in the family Solanaceae, native to the Köpet Dag mountains in Turkmenistan and one location in neighbouring Iran. It differs from the mandrakes found around the Mediterranean (Mandragora autumnalis and/or Mandragora officinarum) chiefly by being larger.

== Description ==
Mandragora turcomanica is a perennial herbaceous plant with a thick, often branched tap-root. It has little or no stem, the leaves being arranged in a basal rosette. The lowest leaves are up to 90 cm (3 ft) long by 60 cm (2 ft) across (less in Iranian specimens), the upper leaves being smaller. The lower leaves are usually irregularly toothed towards the end, the upper leaves being entire. Both sides of the leaves have scattered hairs, mainly along the veins.

Flowering time is autumn to early spring (October to March) in Turkmenistan, late winter to early spring (February to March) in Iran. The flowers are borne in the centre of the rosette, on stalks (pedicels) up to 3 cm (1.2 in) long, usually singly but sometimes with up to 6 flowers. The five sepals are fused at the base to form a bell-shaped cup, lobed to about two thirds of its length of 15–20 mm (0.6–0.8 in) when in flower, lengthening in fruit. The five violet or purple petals are 20–25 mm (0.8–1.0 in) long and similarly fused and lobed. The stamens are included within the flower, joined to the fused petals at the base. The anthers are pale blue. The ripe fruit (a berry) is yellow to orange, 40–60 mm (1.6–2.4 in) in diameter, described as smelling of melons, and containing yellow to light brown seeds, 4–5 mm (0.16–0.20 in) by 6–7 mm (0.24–0.28 in).

== Taxonomy ==
Mandragora turcomanica was first described in 1942 by Olga F. Mizgireva (Ольга Фоминична Мизгирёва), a Turkmenian botanist and former artist. Mizgireva differentiated M. turcomanica from the Mediterranean mandrakes chiefly by the size of the plant (M. turcomanica is larger), the colour of the anthers and the relative sizes of the calyx and corolla.

Ungricht et al. in their 1998 revision of the genus Mandragora retained M. turcomanica as a separate species, although they were not able to examine either any herbarium specimens or any live plants. They said that further study was needed to compare the ranges of variation of this species and their concept of Mandragora officinarum. In 2003, Akhani and Ghorbani reported the occurrence of M. turcomanica in Iran. They considered that it was sufficiently similar to the Mediterranean species that the rank of subspecies rather than species might be appropriate, although further study was needed. A 2010 molecular phylogenetic study placed M. turcomanica in a clade with the authors' concept of Mandragora autumnalis.

== Distribution and habitat ==
Mandragora turcomanica was first discovered in the south-western Kopet Dag mountains in Turkmenistan. Ungricht et al. queried whether it might also occur in the same mountain chain across the border in Iran. It was reported in Iran in 2003, near the village of Dahaneh close to the Golestan National Park. It was growing in gardens, where it had been transplanted from wild sources. In Turkmenistan, the species grows in shrubland, in ravines and on stony mountain slopes, especially among Paliurus spina-christi, at altitudes of 500–700 m (1,600–2,300 ft).

== Conservation ==
Mandragora turcomanica was reported to be "on the verge of extinction" in Turkmenistan in 2001. There were said to be fewer than 500 plants in their natural habitats in Turkmenistan in 1999. Only about 50 plants were in cultivation in the sole Iranian location in 2010.

== Toxicity and uses ==
All the species of Mandragora are described as toxic and to have had traditional medicinal uses. Mizgireva is reported to have said in 1942 that it was used by the local people in Turkmenistan as a medicinal plant. In Iran, the discoverers of M. turcomanica described it as an "old medicinal and mythically important plant" but said that they were unable to discover earlier local uses.

At the beginning of the growth cycle, the leaves of M. turcomanica contained 0.3% of alkaloids; later the roots contained 0.2%. By contrast the unripe fruits contained only 0.07% and the ripe seeds only 0.03%. The main alkaloids were the tropane alkaloids scopolamine (hyoscine), apohyoscine and hyoscyamine; others detected included belladonnine, norhyoscyamine, apoatropine, 3α-trigloyloxytropan-6β-ol and tigloidine. Tropane alkaloids are potentially highly toxic. A wide range of lipids and lipid-like compounds were also identified.
