= Olga Mizgireva =

Botanist and painter (1908–1994)

Olga Fominichna Mizgireva (Russian: Ольга Фоминична Mизгирёва; 1908 – 1994) was a Turkmenistani painter and botanist.

== Life ==
Mizgireva was born in Tashkent in 1908. Her family stems from the village of Garrygala in southwest Turkmenistan. As a child, she exhibited interest in painting, and attended the experimental UShIV (Note: Ударная школа искусств Востока, Eastern Shock-School of Arts) school for young talents in Ashgabat. Alexander Vladychik, the director of the school, would become her husband. Her art was based on the traditional Turkmen motifs, painted in bright colors. Her paintings Heat, Turkmen girls, Creativity Carpet, and Four Wives are now on exhibit in the Turkmen Museum of Fine Arts.

In 1934, she received a commission for illustration of species collection of tulips by academician Nikolai Vavilov, on an order from the Netherlands. The work included several thousands of drawings. She returned to her home area of Garrygala, and started working as a laboratory technician in the Turkmenistan Research Station of the Federal Institute of Agriculture. She would remain there for her entire life. She took the duty of the director of the station in 1944, the position she would keep for her whole career, until the retirement in 1981. She spent many years to help establishment of a Zapovednik (national park) in the Kopet Dag mountains, which was opened as the Sünt-Hasardag Nature Reserve park in 1973.

Mizgireva is credited with the 1938 discovery of Turkmenian mandrake, Mandragora turcomanica, rare species of mandrake from the Kopet-Dag area.
