= Scopine =

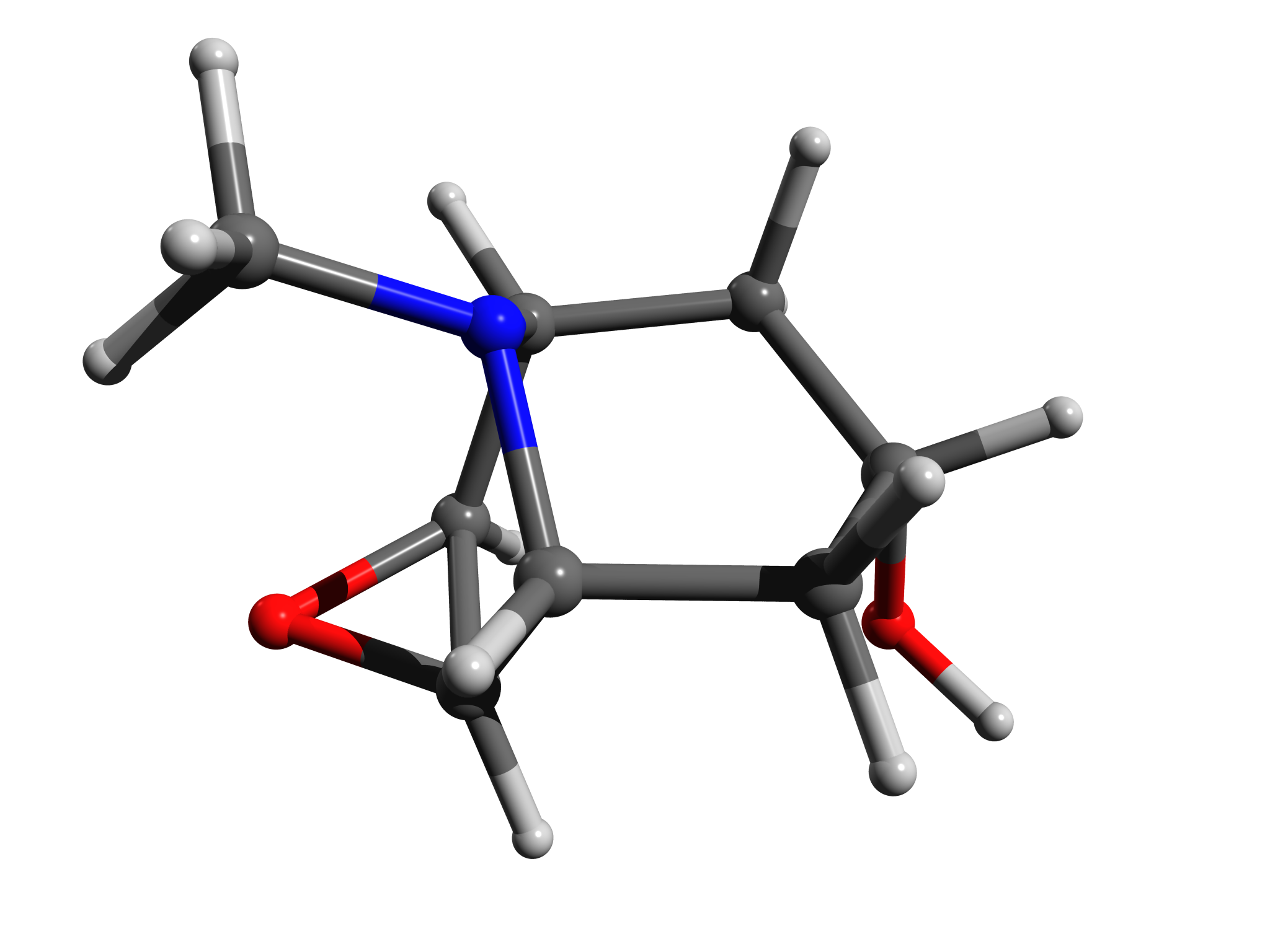

Names
- IUPAC name 6β,7β-Epoxytropan-3α-ol
- Systematic IUPAC name (1R,2R,4S,5S,7s)-9-Methyl-3-oxa-9-azatricyclo[3.3.1.0^{2,4}]nonan-7-ol
- Other names 6,7-Epoxytropine; Scopanol; Scopin; 6β,7β-Epoxy-1αH,5αH-tropan-3α-ol

Identifiers
CAS Number	498-45-3
3D model (JSmol)	Interactive image
ChEMBL	ChEMBL4303435; ChEMBL4303536
ChemSpider	20067940
PubChem CID	1274465
UNII	Z5LGM3Q28U
CompTox Dashboard (EPA)	DTXSID801030466
- InChI: InChI=1S/C8H13NO2/c1-9-5-2-4(10)3-6(9)8-7(5)11-8/h4-8,10H,2-3H2,1H3/t4-,5-,6+,7-,8+ Key: FIMXSEMBHGTNKT-RZVDLVGDSA-N
- SMILES: O[C@@H]1C[C@H]2N(C)[C@@H](C1)[C@@H]3O[C@H]23

Properties
Chemical formula	C_{8}H_{13}NO_{2}
Molar mass	155.197 g·mol^{−1}
Melting point	75 to 76 °C (167 to 169 °F; 348 to 349 K)
- Except where otherwise noted, data are given for materials in their standard state (at 25 °C [77 °F], 100 kPa). Infobox references

Scopine is a tropane alkaloid found in a variety of plants including Mandragora root, Senecio mikanioides (Delairea odorata), Scopolia carniolica, and Scopolia lurida. It is a naturally white to crystalline-white solid powder.

Scopine can be prepared by the hydrolysis of scopolamine. It can also be prepared in three steps from N-methoxycarbonylpyrrole and 1,1,3,3-tetrabromoacetone; the reagents are combined in a [4+3] cycloaddition, followed by a diastereoselective reduction with diisobutylaluminum hydride, and finally a Prilezhaev epoxidation with trifluoroperacetic acid affords scopine.

Biologically, scopine is a metabolite product of anisodine, an α1-adrenergic receptor agonist.

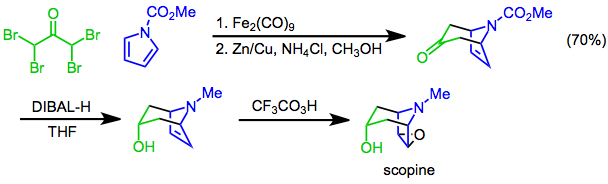

== Alkaloids ==
- Scopolamine
- Aposcopolamine
- Anisodine
- Butylscopolamine
