= Tigloidine =

Chemical compound

Clinical data
- Trade names: Tropigline

Identifiers
- IUPAC name: (8-Methyl-8-azabicyclo[3.2.1]octan-3-yl) (E)-2-methylbut-2-enoate
- CAS Number: 495-83-0
- PubChem CID: 5281865
- ChemSpider: 16736065
- UNII: 75GK1SV4EI
- KEGG: C10868
- ChEBI: CHEBI:9593
- ChEMBL: ChEMBL2107120
- ECHA InfoCard: 100.007.101

Chemical and physical data
- Formula: C_{13}H_{21}NO_{2}
- Molar mass: 223.316 g·mol^{−1}
- 3D model (JSmol): Interactive image
- SMILES: CC=C(C)C(=O)OC1CC2CCC(C1)N2C
- InChI: InChI=1S/C13H21NO2/c1-4-9(2)13(15)16-12-7-10-5-6-11(8-12)14(10)3/h4,10-12H,5-8H2,1-3H3/b9-4+; Key:UVHGSMZRSVGWDJ-RUDMXATFSA-N

Tigloidine is a tropane alkaloid that naturally occurs as a minor constituent of a number of solanaceous plants, including Duboisia myoporoides, Physalis peruviana, and Mandragora turcomanica.

It was formerly marketed as an antiparkinsonian drug under the trade name Tropigline.

== See also ==
- Pseudotropine
