= Mandragora caulescens =

Scientific classification
- Kingdom: Plantae
- Clade: Tracheophytes
- Clade: Angiosperms
- Clade: Eudicots
- Clade: Asterids
- Order: Solanales
- Family: Solanaceae
- Genus: Mandragora
- Species: M. caulescens

Binomial name
- Mandragora caulescens C.B.Clarke

Synonyms
- Anisodus caulescens (C.B.Clarke) Diels; Anisodus mariae Pascher; Mairella yunnanensis H.Léveillé; Mandragora chinghaiensis Kuang & A.M.Lu; Mandragora tibetica Grubov.

Species of plant

Mandragora caulescens, the Himalayan mandrake, is a perennial herbaceous plant in the family Solanaceae, native to the Himalayas and mountainous regions of Myanmar and south-west China. One of the differences from the other species of Mandragora is that it has a stem, whereas they are stemless. Like all species of Mandragora, it contains tropane alkaloids, making it toxic. It is used in traditional Chinese medicine.

== Description ==
Mandragora caulescens is a perennial herbaceous plant with a thick root. There is considerable variability in the size and shape of its parts and in the colour of its flowers. Unlike other members of the genus Mandragora, it usually has a stem, 10–40 cm (4–16 in) long (sometimes up to 60 cm (24 in)), making the plant as a whole usually 20–60 cm (8–24 in) tall. The leaves are mostly basal but are also found along the stem. They are up to 30 cm (12 in) long, including the stalk (petiole).

The flowering period is from April or May to July or September, with fruits appearing until October. The flowers are borne singly on stalks (pedicels) 5–20 cm (2–8 in) long. The sepals are joined at the base to form a lobed cup-shaped structure, often nearly as long as the petals. The petals are dark purple or yellow, similarly joined at the base with lobes about half their length of 5–30 mm (0.2–1.2 in). The stamens are joined to the base of the petals, and vary considerably in length, with the anthers 1–5 mm (0.04–0.20 in) long. The fruit is a berry, greenish white to yellow in colour, up to 25 mm (1 in) across. The numerous seeds are yellow to light brown, 1.5–3 mm (0.06–0.12 in) long.

== Taxonomy ==
Mandragora caulescens was first described by Charles Baron Clarke in 1883. In 1978, division into four subspecies was proposed, but this has not been accepted by subsequent researchers. Mandragora tibetica, described in 1970, and Mandragora chinghaiensis, described in 1978, are also, as of April 2015, not considered to be sufficiently differentiated from M. caulescens, although the Flora of China says that "further study may lead to separation of independent taxa from the single species recognized here."

A molecular phylogenetic study found that M. caulescens (including M. chinghaiensis) is distinct from the remaining species within the genus, which form a separate clade.

== Distribution and habitat ==
Mandragora caulescens is a "Sino-Himalayan" species, native to Nepal, northern India (including Sikkim from where it was first described), Bhutan, Myanmar, and south-west China (south-east Qinghai, west Sichuan, east Xizang (Tibet), and north-west Yunnan).

M. caulescens grows in open areas, such as grassland, moorland, pastures and stony slopes and screes, particularly among Rhododendron shrubs. It is found in the subalpine and alpine zones, at altitudes of 2,200–4,900 m (7,200–16,100 ft).

== Toxicity and uses ==
All species of Mandragora contain highly biologically active alkaloids, tropane alkaloids in particular. The different parts of the plant contain different proportions and concentrations of alkaloids, with the roots generally having the highest concentration. Tropane alkaloids are potentially highly toxic. The roots of M. caulescens contain hyoscine and anisodamine, which are used medicinally in China. The dried roots of M. caulescens are used in Chinese herbal medicine, and in Yunnan and Xizang as a substitute for ginseng.
