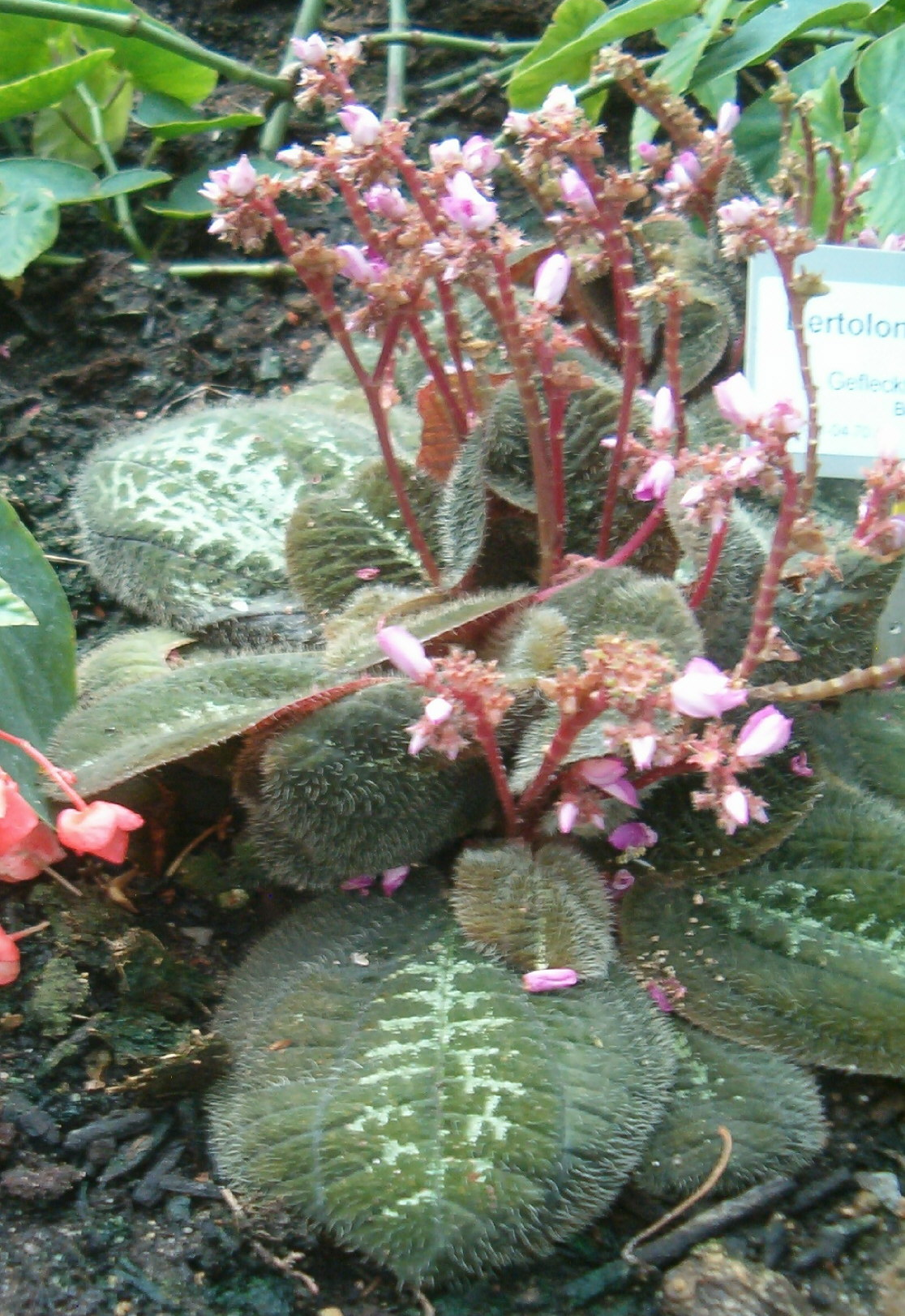
- Bertolonia maculata

Scientific classification
- Kingdom: Plantae
- Clade: Embryophytes
- Clade: Tracheophytes
- Clade: Angiosperms
- Clade: Eudicots
- Clade: Rosids
- Order: Myrtales
- Family: Melastomataceae
- Genus: Bertolonia; Raddi

Species
- See text

= Bertolonia =

Genus of flowering plants

Bertolonia is a genus consisting of 14 species of pretty, dwarf, creeping, tender perennials, native to tropical South America. These herbaceous plants are grown for their colorful, velvety, ornamental foliages, vary from shimmery white with purple, pink with purple, or bronze-green with carmine and lighter midribs, purple beneath. Leaves are coarsely hairy, oval 7 cm (3 in) long on short stalks. The plants bear clusters of small, bell-shaped flowers repeatedly, just above the leaves, color ranges from pink, red, yellow to purple.

== Species ==
- Bertolonia argyrea
- Bertolonia guttata
- Bertolonia houttea
- Bertolonia maculata
- Bertolonia marmorata
- Bertolonia mosenii
- Bertolonia sp iporanga
- Bertolonia venezuelensis
- Bertolonia wentii
