= Anisodamine =

Chemical compound

Clinical data
- Other names: (6S)-6-hydroxyhyoscyamine, (-)-6β-hydroxyhyoscyamine
- ATC code: None

Pharmacokinetic data
- Bioavailability: low (oral)
- Excretion: when oral: urine (2%), feces (>90%)

Identifiers
- IUPAC name: [(1S,3S,5S,7S)-7-Hydroxy-8-methyl-8-azabicyclo[3.2.1]octan-3-yl] (2S)-3-hydroxy-2-phenyl-propanoate
- CAS Number: 55869-99-3
- PubChem CID: 183088
- ChemSpider: 159209
- UNII: 01343Q8EL8
- ECHA InfoCard: 100.164.962

Chemical and physical data
- Formula: C_{17}H_{23}NO_{4}
- Molar mass: 305.374 g·mol^{−1}
- 3D model (JSmol): Interactive image
- Specific rotation: 9.0–11.5°
- SMILES: O=C(O[C@@H]1C[C@@H]2N(C)[C@H](C1)C[C@@H]2O)[C@@H](c3ccccc3)CO
- InChI: InChI=1S/C17H23NO4/c1-18-12-7-13(9-15(18)16(20)8-12)22-17(21)14(10-19)11-5-3-2-4-6-11/h2-6,12-16,19-20H,7-10H2,1H3/t12-,13+,14-,15+,16+/m1/s1; Key:WTQYWNWRJNXDEG-LEOABGAYSA-N

Anisodamine, also known as (6S)-6-hydroxyhyoscyamine, is a mAChR anticholinergic and α_{1} adrenergic receptor antagonist used in China. It is given orally or by injection, as a racemic mixture (racanisodamine) or as a hydrobromide salt of the natural enantiometer. It is injected to treat acute circulatory shock, used orally to treat smooth muscle spasms in the GI tract, and as an eye drop at 0.5% concentration for slowing the progression of myopia.

Anisodamine is a naturally occurring tropane alkaloid found in some plants of the family Solanaceae including Datura. Its English name anisodamine and its Mandarin Chinese name 山莨菪碱 are given after Anisodus tanguticus (Chinese: 山莨菪; pinyin: shān làng dàng).

In rodents, anisodamine is more "selective" in its action compared to atropine. It poorly passes the blood-brain barrier and binds brain mAChR less tightly. In rodents, it exhibits weaker CNS effects, causes less mydriasis, but has approximately equal or slightly lower potency in blocking spasms and in reducing GI motility. Chinese textbooks consider it to have a similar spectrum of effects on humans. As a result, it (or rather, its synthetic racemic version) is widely used in China. It was added to China's national Essential Medicine List in 2012.

== Chemical identity ==
=== The natural alkaloid ===
Sources appear to disagree on the identity of anisodamine, specifically on the description of the hydroxy-8-methyl-8-azabicyclo[3.2.1]octan-3-yl ring. The first thing they disagree on is whether the substance is 6- or 7-hydroxy, though because the ring is symmetric the two numberings are equivalent: all of these assignments yield the same InChI connectivity layer and the corresponding InChIKey "main" segment (WTQYWNWRJNXDEG).

More problematic is the assignment of stereochemistry. Chemspider (which this article's infobox is largely based on) uses a structure similar to PubChem CID 183088, with (1S,3S,5S,7S)-7-hydroxy or (1S,3S,5S,6S)-6-hydroxy (InChI t12-,13+,14-,15+,16+/m1). However, as of April 2026, the name "anisodamine" is assigned by PubChem to CID 6918612, (1R,3S,5R,6S)-6-hydroxy (InChI t12-,13-,14+,15+,16-/m0); FDA UNII has the same assignment.

The Chinese pharmacopoeia describes anisodamine HBr as a C_{17}H_{23}NO_{4}•HBr derived from Anisodus tanguticus without mentioning its exact conformation. It includes the CAS number 55449-49-5, which returns the (1R,3S,5R,6S) on both PubChem and ChemSpider.

=== The racemer ===
The Chinese pharmacopoeia describes racanisodamine as "(±)-6β-hydroxy-1αH,5αH-tropin-3-yl tropate ester" with CAS number 17659-49-3.

== See also ==
- Anisodine
- Atropine, used for similar cardiac and optamological purposes elsewhere
- Hyoscyamine
