= Anisodine =

Chemical compound

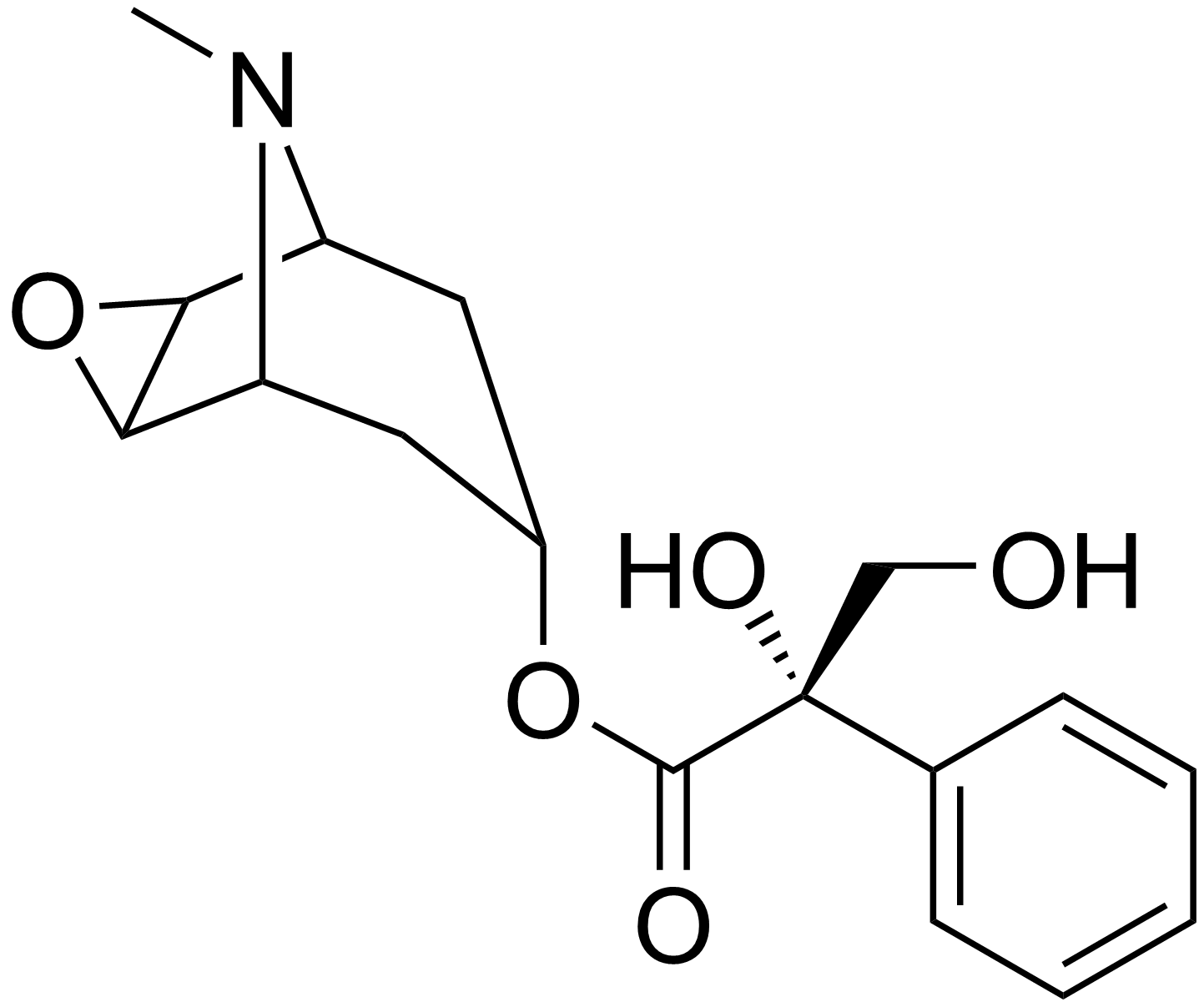

Clinical data
- ATC code: none

Identifiers
- IUPAC name: 9-methyl-3-oxa-9-azatricyclo[3.2.1.0^{2,4}]non-7-yl α-hydroxy-α-(hydroxymethyl)benzeneacetate
- CAS Number: 52646-92-1
- PubChem CID: 4105431
- ChemSpider: 9791461
- UNII: Z75256J75J
- CompTox Dashboard (EPA): DTXSID20967080

Chemical and physical data
- Formula: C_{17}H_{21}NO_{5}
- Molar mass: 319.357 g·mol^{−1}
- 3D model (JSmol): Interactive image
- SMILES: O=C(OC1CC2N(C(C1)C3OC23)C)C(O)(c4ccccc4)CO
- InChI: InChI=1S/C17H21NO5/c1-18-12-7-11(8-13(18)15-14(12)23-15)22-16(20)17(21,9-19)10-5-3-2-4-6-10/h2-6,11-15,19,21H,7-9H2,1H3/t11?,12-,13+,14-,15+,17-/m1/s1; Key:JEJREKXHLFEVHN-QDXGGTILSA-N

Anisodine, also known as daturamine and α-hydroxyscopolamine, is an antispasmodic and anticholinergic drug used in the treatment of acute circulatory shock in China. It is a tropane alkaloid and is found naturally in plants of the family Solanaceae - notably Anisodus tanguticus (syn. Scopolia tangutica. Anisodine acts as a muscarinic acetylcholine receptor antagonist and α_{1}-adrenergic receptor antagonist.

== Compound medications ==
Anisodine/procaine is an injected prescription drug in China, approved for "ischemic optic nerve, retinal, and choroidal lesions". It is believed to work by reliving vascular spasms.

== Synthesis ==
(-)-Anisodine can be efficiently prepared using 6-beta-acetyltropine as the starting material via a key step of the Sharpless asymmetric dihydroxylation (AD).

== See also ==
- Anisodamine
- Scopolamine
