= Antonio Bertoloni =

Italian physician and botanist

Antonio Bertoloni (February 8, 1775 in Sarzana – April 17, 1869 in Bologna) was an Italian medical doctor and botanist who made extensive studies of Italian plants. He also collected notable samples of Central American flora.

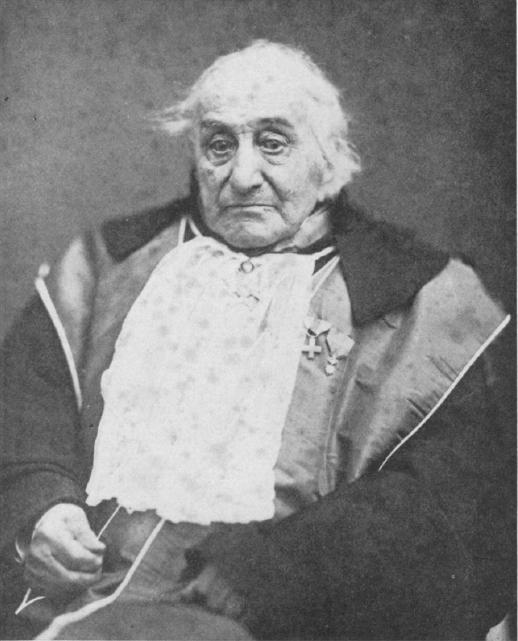

== Biography ==
He studied medicine and botany at the University of Pavia, afterwards (1796) continuing his medical education in Genoa. For a period of time he practiced medicine in his home town of Sarzana. In 1811 he returned to Genoa, where he served as a professor of physics at the Imperial Lyceum. In 1815 he was appointed professor of botany at the University of Bologna.

His son Giuseppe (1804-1874) was a botanist and entomologist in Bologna.

== Tributes ==
- Bertolonia, botanical genus from the family Melastomataceae.
- Plants with the specific epithet of bertolonii, an example being Ophrys bertolonii (Bertoloni's bee orchid).

== Selected works ==
His major work, "Flora Italica; sistens plantas in Italia et in insulis circumstantibus sponte nascentes", was issued in several volumes from 1833 to 1854. This was followed by a monograph on Italian cryptogams called "Flora italica cryptogama" (1858). Other noteworthy publications by Bertoloni include:

- "Rariorum Liguriae plantarum", 1803.
- "Mantissa plantarum florae alpium Apunanarum", 1832.
- Commentarius de Mandragoris, 1835
- "Florula guatimalensis sistens plantas nonnullas in Guatimala sponte nascentes", 1840.

Other works include:

- Elenchus plantarum vivarum quas cum aliis vivis plantis commutandas exhibet Hortus Botanicus Archigymnasii Bononiensi 1820.
- "Excerpta de re Herbaria", Opuscoli Scientifici, 4: 220–232, 1823

He published many papers, in both Italian and Latin, in the journals Nuovi annali delle scienze naturali (1834-1854), and Novi Commentarii Academiae Scientiarum Instituti Bononiensis (1834-1849) and its successor Memorie della Accademia delle Scienze dell'Istituto di Bologna (from 1850 onward). A large number of the papers in the second and third of those journals were part of an extended series entitled Miscellanea Botanica (starting in 1842), which included everything from the discussion of botanical references in Biblical and Ancient Greek and Roman sources through the systematisation of published knowledge to the formal description of new species. (Note: It is impossible to tell whether or not, or how, his choice of subject-matter may have been influenced by the fact that all those journals were subject to ecclesiastical censorship. The earliest volumes of Novi Comment. Acad. sci. Inst. bonon. commence with a flattering dedication to the Pope or to the cardinal whose authority extended over Bologna, and all volumes of both journals were only published with the imprimatur of one or two officials in the Catholic Church.)
