= Belladonnine =

Names
- IUPAC name Bis(8-methyl-8-azabicyclo[3.2.1]octan-3-yl) (1S,4S)-4-phenyl-2,3-dihydro-1H-naphthalene-1,4-dicarboxylate

Identifiers
CAS Number	510-25-8
3D model (JSmol)	Interactive image
ChEBI	CHEBI:3006
PubChem CID	442995
UNII	1DF50P9K2I
CompTox Dashboard (EPA)	DTXSID10965277
- InChI: InChI=1S/C34H42N2O4/c1-35-23-12-13-24(35)19-27(18-23)39-32(37)30-16-17-34(22-8-4-3-5-9-22,31-11-7-6-10-29(30)31)33(38)40-28-20-25-14-15-26(21-28)36(25)2/h3-11,23-28,30H,12-21H2,1-2H3/t23?,24?,25?,26?,27?,28?,30-,34-/m0/s1 Key: GERIGMSHTUAXSI-KZYONXTKSA-N
- SMILES: CN1C2CCC1CC(C2)OC(=O)[C@H]3CC[C@@](C4=CC=CC=C34)(C5=CC=CC=C5)C(=O)OC6CC7CCC(C6)N7C

Properties
Chemical formula	C_{34}H_{42}N_{2}O_{4}
Molar mass	542.720 g·mol^{−1}
- Except where otherwise noted, data are given for materials in their standard state (at 25 °C [77 °F], 100 kPa). Infobox references

Belladonnine is a tropane alkaloid found in plants of the Solanaceae family. Is the cyclized dimer of apoatropine, dimer of atropic acid belladonnic, NCH3 tropine belladonnate. Belladonnine is structurally similar to atropine and scopolamine, which is why it is difficult to isolate it from a mixture of alkaloids. Commercially available preparations called "belladonnine" are sometimes a mixture of this chemicals. It is found in the root of mandrake.

It has a psychoactive effect comparable to that of cuscohygrine, norhyoscyamine and tanacetamine.
