= Apoatropine =

Names
- IUPAC name (8-Methyl-8-azabicyclo[3.2.1]octan-3-yl) 2-phenylprop-2-enoate
- Other names Apoatropine Hydrochloride, Atropamin Hydrochloride, Atropyltropeine Hydrochloride, Apoascyamine, and Atropane.

Identifiers
CAS Number	500-55-0
3D model (JSmol)	Interactive image
ChemSpider	58243
ECHA InfoCard	100.007.188
EC Number	207-906-7
PubChem CID	64695
UNII	3B4C10J0BP
CompTox Dashboard (EPA)	DTXSID70871704
- InChI: InChI=1S/C17H21NO2/c1-12(13-6-4-3-5-7-13)17(19)20-16-10-14-8-9-15(11-16)18(14)2/h3-7,14-16H,1,8-11H2,2H3 Key: WPUIZWXOSDVQJU-UHFFFAOYSA-N
- SMILES: CN1C2CCC1CC(C2)OC(=O)C(=C)C3=CC=CC=C3

Properties
Chemical formula	C_{17}H_{21}NO_{2}
Molar mass	271.360 g·mol^{−1}
Appearance	White or off whiteish and crystalline
Melting point	>236 °C (HCl salt, decomposes)
Solubility in water	Soluble in water, alcohol, and ether

Hazards
- Occupational safety and health (OHS/OSH)
Main hazards	Considered poisonous
- Except where otherwise noted, data are given for materials in their standard state (at 25 °C [77 °F], 100 kPa). Infobox references

Apoatropine (atropatropine) is a member of class of tropane alkaloids. Chemically, it is an ester formed from tropine and atropic acid. Apoatropine can be found in plants of family Solanaceae. It is a bitter crystalline alkaloid. Examples of related tropane alkaloids include atropine, hyoscyamine, and hyoscine. Though apoatropine is found in various plants, it can also be prepared by the dehydration of atropine using nitric acid . Apoatropine is used as a pigment.

== Toxicity ==
It is said to be 20 times more toxic than atropine.
