= Coleophora ptarmicia =

Scientific classification
- Kingdom: Animalia
- Phylum: Arthropoda
- Class: Insecta
- Order: Lepidoptera
- Family: Coleophoridae
- Genus: Coleophora
- Species: C. ptarmicia

Binomial name
- Coleophora ptarmicia Walsingham, 1910

Synonyms
- Coleophora ptarmica Toll, 1962; Coleophora zimmermanni Rebel, 1937

Species of moth

Coleophora ptarmicia is a moth of the family Coleophoridae. It is found in Austria, Croatia, Slovakia, the Czech Republic, France, Hungary, Italy (including Sicily), Latvia, Lithuania, southern Russia, and the eastern Palearctic realm. It is also found in China.

The larvae feed on Achillea collina, Achillea millefolium, Achillea ptarmica and Achillea setacea. Full-grown larvae can be found at the end of May.
