= Coleophora pseudorepentis =

Scientific classification
- Kingdom: Animalia
- Phylum: Arthropoda
- Class: Insecta
- Order: Lepidoptera
- Family: Coleophoridae
- Genus: Coleophora
- Species: C. pseudorepentis

Binomial name
- Coleophora pseudorepentis Toll, 1960

Species of moth

Coleophora pseudorepentis is a moth of the family Coleophoridae. It is found in France, Germany, Austria, Italy, Croatia, Hungary, Slovakia, Ukraine, Sardinia and Corsica.

The larvae feed on Achillea odorata and Achillea ligustica. They feed on the generative organs of their host plant.
