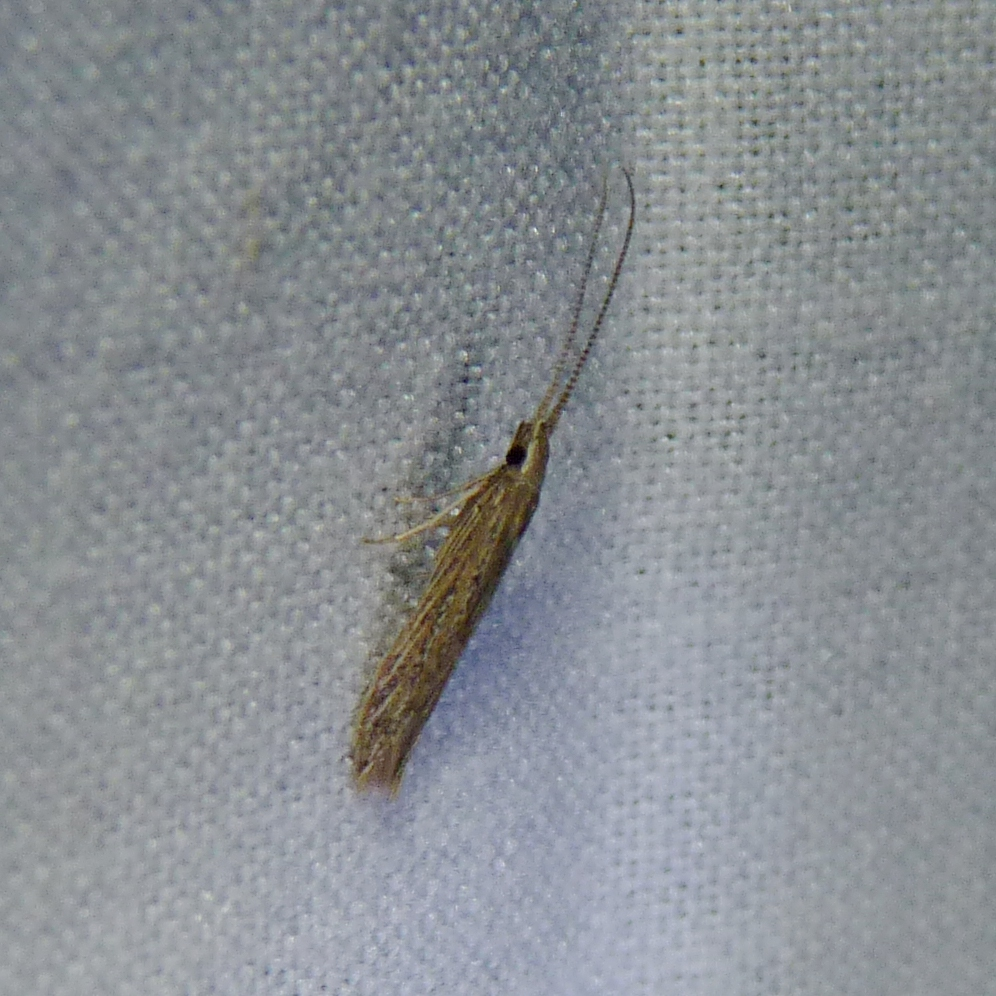

Scientific classification
- Kingdom: Animalia
- Phylum: Arthropoda
- Class: Insecta
- Order: Lepidoptera
- Family: Coleophoridae
- Genus: Coleophora
- Species: C. quadruplex

Binomial name
- Coleophora quadruplex McDunnough, 1940

= Coleophora quadruplex =

Species of moth

Coleophora quadruplex is a moth of the family Coleophoridae. It is found in North America, including Nova Scotia, Illinois, Maine, Massachusetts and New York.

The larvae feed on the seeds of Achillea species, including Achillea millefolium. They create a trivalved, tubular silken case.
