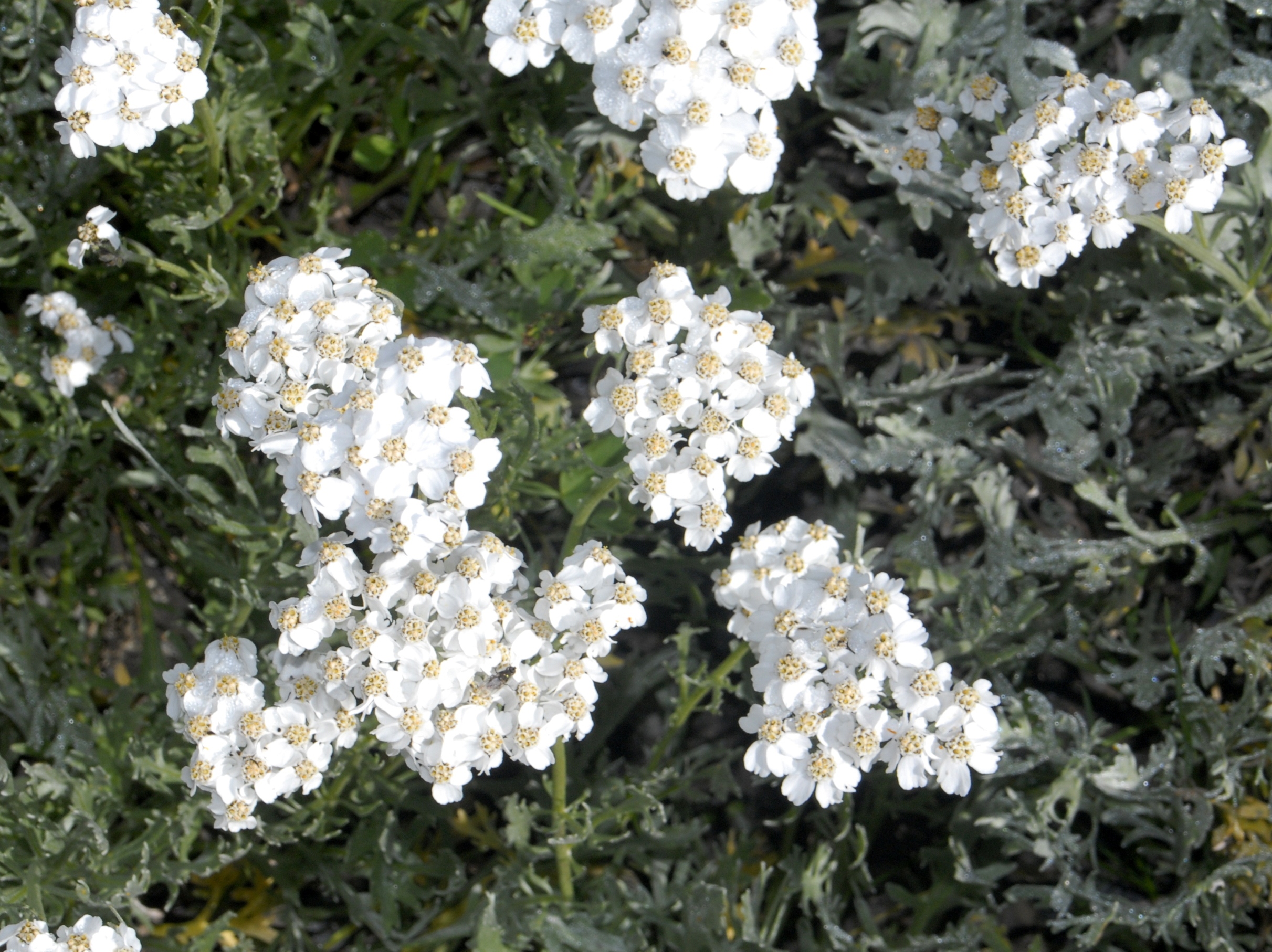
- Inflorescences of Achillea clavennae at the Giardino Botanico Alpino Chanousia

Scientific classification
- Kingdom: Plantae
- Clade: Tracheophytes
- Clade: Angiosperms
- Clade: Eudicots
- Clade: Asterids
- Order: Asterales
- Family: Asteraceae
- Genus: Achillea
- Species: A. clavennae

Binomial name
- Achillea clavennae L.

Synonyms
- Synonymy: Achillea absinthifolia (Clairv.) Clairv.; Achillea argentea Salisb.; Achillea argentea Vis.; Achillea capitata Willd.; Achillea glavennae Schrank.; Achillea intercedens Dalla Torre; Achillea millii Heldr. ex Boiss.; Achillea tyrolensis Wender; Achillea visianii Dalla Torre; Chamaemelum clavennae (L.) E.H.L.Krause; Ptarmica clavennae (L.) DC.

= Achillea clavennae =

Species of yarrow

Achillea clavennae, the silvery yarrow, is a herbaceous perennial flowering plant in the sunflower family. The species name (clavennae) honors the 17th-century Italian botanist N. Clavena.

== Description ==
Achillea clavennae can reach a height of about 25 centimetres (10 in). The leaves are silvery silky-hairy, pinnatifid, cut into some lobes, alternate, and about 4–8 cm (1 1/2–3 in) long. From June to August, many loose clusters of flowers bloom.

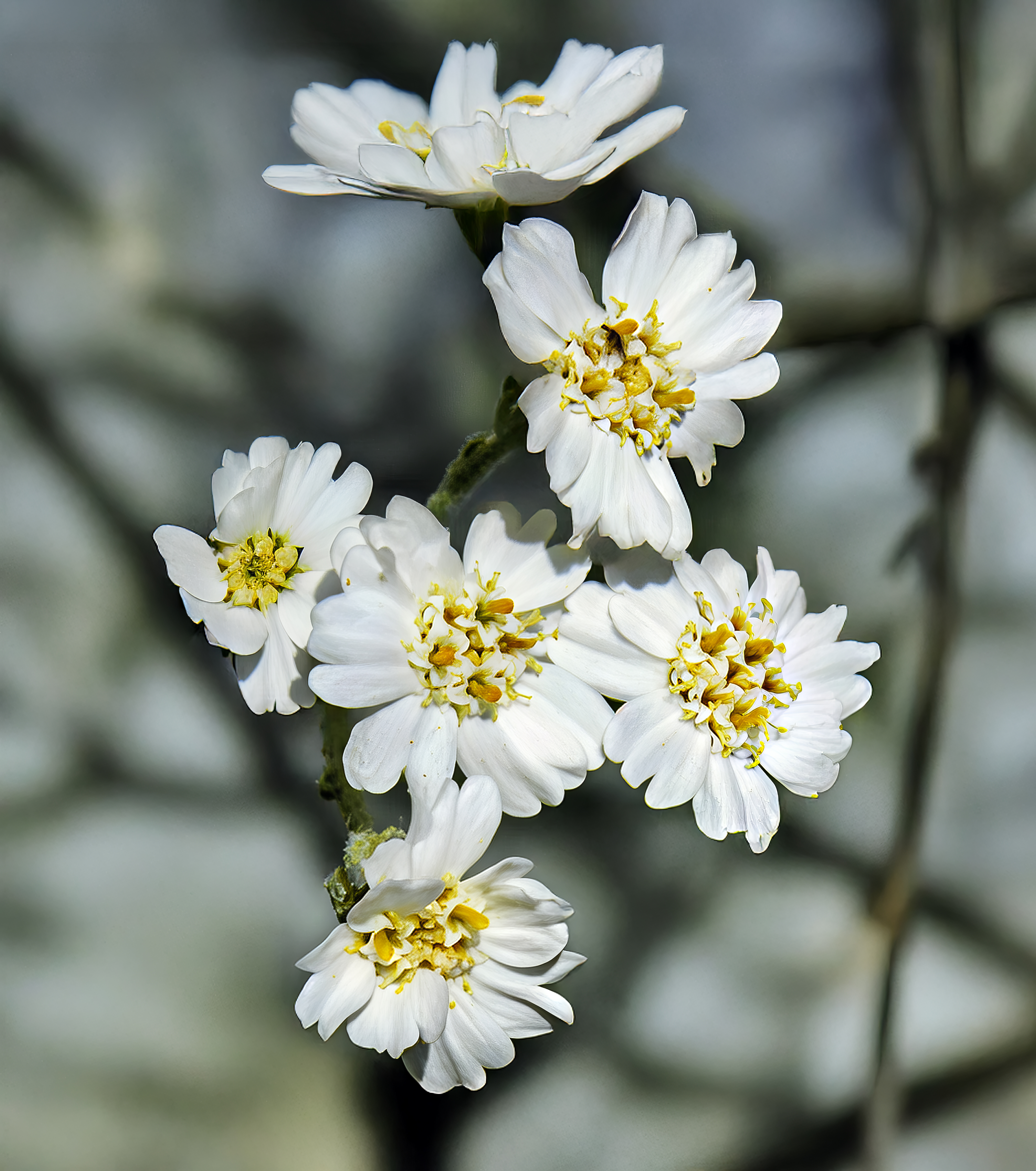
Flowers

== Distribution and habitat ==
This species is native to Central Europe, the eastern Alps, the southern Alps up to the Balkan Peninsula.

This plant prefers sunny slopes in mountain regions.
