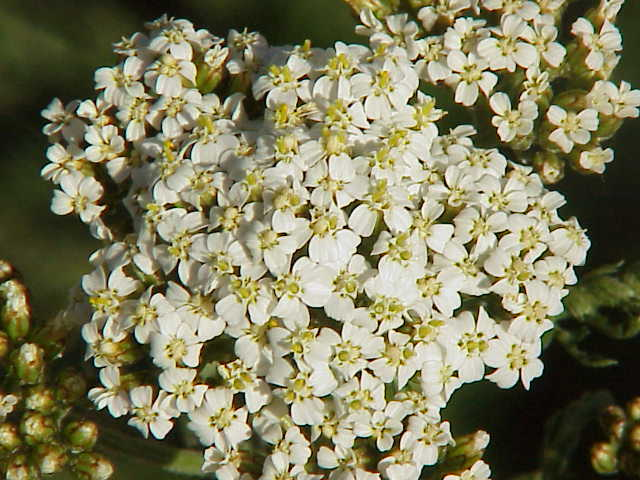

Scientific classification
- Kingdom: Plantae
- Clade: Tracheophytes
- Clade: Angiosperms
- Clade: Eudicots
- Clade: Asterids
- Order: Asterales
- Family: Asteraceae
- Genus: Achillea
- Species: A. aspleniifolia

Binomial name
- Achillea aspleniifolia Vent.

= Achillea aspleniifolia =

Species of yarrow

Achillea aspleniifolia is a species of flowering plant belonging to the family Asteraceae.

Its native range is Central and Southern Europe.

Synonym:

- Achillea asplenifolia (orthographical variant)
