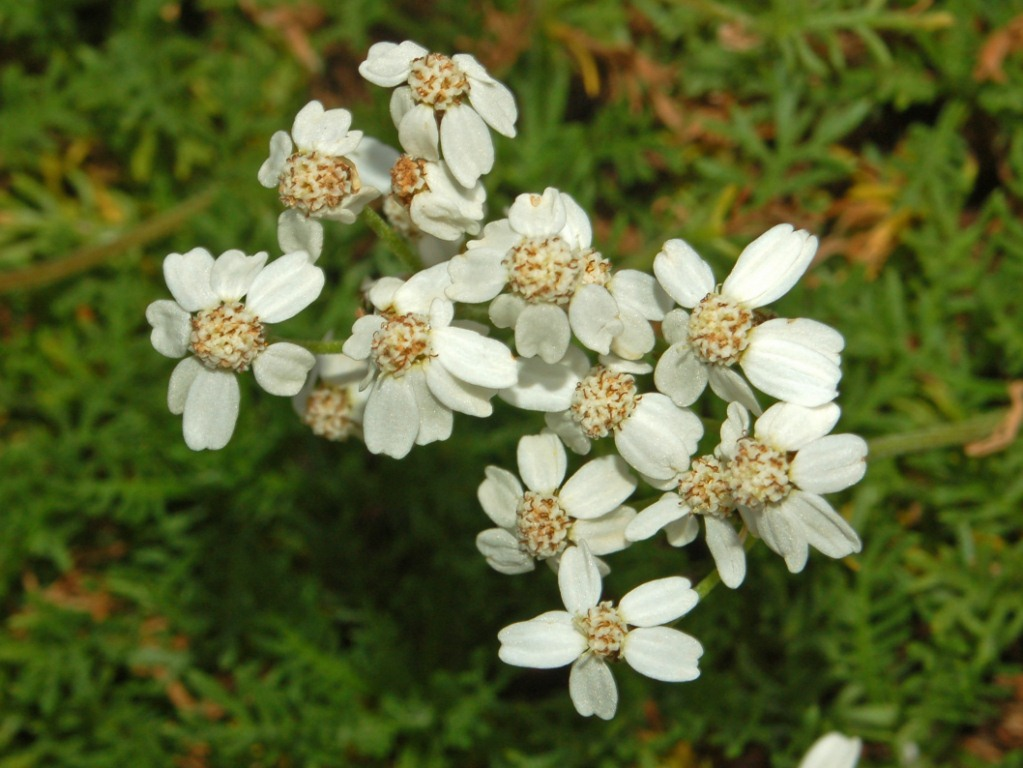
- Flowers of Achillea erba-rotta

Scientific classification
- Kingdom: Plantae
- Clade: Tracheophytes
- Clade: Angiosperms
- Clade: Eudicots
- Clade: Asterids
- Order: Asterales
- Family: Asteraceae
- Genus: Achillea
- Species: A. erba-rotta

Binomial name
- Achillea erba-rotta All.

Synonyms
- Achillea cuneifolia Lam.; Achillea haussknechtiana Asch.; Achillea herba-rota All.; Achillea herba-rotta Vill.; Achillea morisiana Rchb.; Ptarmica erba-rotta (All.) DC.

= Achillea erba-rotta =

Species of yarrow

Achillea erba-rotta, common name simple leaved milfoil, is a perennial flowering plant of the genus Achillea, belonging to the sunflower family.

== Description ==
Achillea erba-rotta is a polymorphic species, as its physical characteristics clearly vary depending on the variety. The biological form is chamaephyte suffruticose, as these plants have perennating buds borne close to the ground and are woody in the lower part of the stem, with herbaceous yearly branches. The primary root is a rhizome.

This plant reaches on average 12–18 centimetres (4 3/4–7 in) in height. The stems are woody and creeping, almost glabrous or with short hair and with erect flowering branches. The leaves of sterile branches are lanceolate-spatulate, 5–7 millimetres (3/16–1/4 in) wide and 26–30 mm (1–1 1/8 in) long, with 4–7 teeth on each side. Cauline leaves are alternate, sessile, toothed and progressively linear, about 2–3 mm (1/16–1/8 in) wide and 11–22 mm (7/16–7/8 in) long. Appearing from July to August, the flowers are hermaphroditic and pentamerous, arranged in corymbs with many heads, about 3 mm in diameter, with rounded ligules. The fruit is a flattened achene with no pappus.

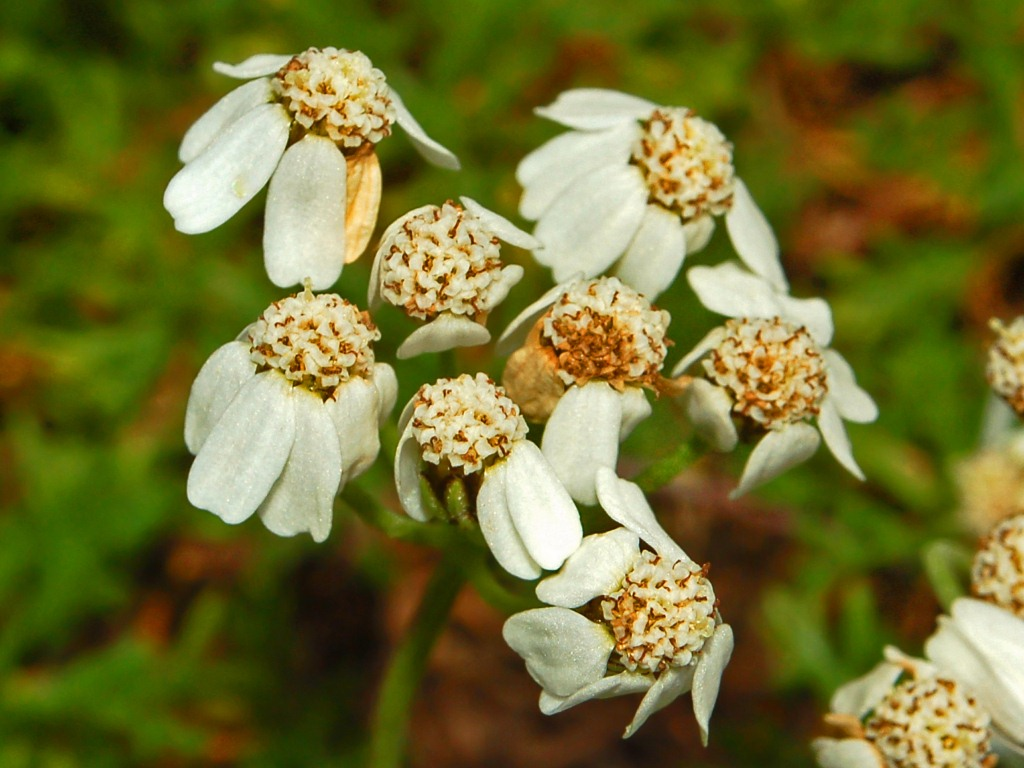
Close-up of flowers

== Subdivision ==
=== Subspecies ===
The following subspecies are accepted by the Plant List:

- Achillea erba-rotta subsp. erba-rotta
- Achillea erba-rotta subsp. moschata (Wulfen) Vacc.
- Achillea erba-rotta subsp. rupestris (Porta) I.Richardson

=== Hybrids ===
- Achillea × obscura Nees

== Distribution and habitat ==
This typical plant of Alps is present in Italy, France, Switzerland and Austria.

It prefers a sunny location in alpine pastures and rocky areas, at an altitude of 2,000–2,800 metres (6,600–9,200 ft) above sea level.
