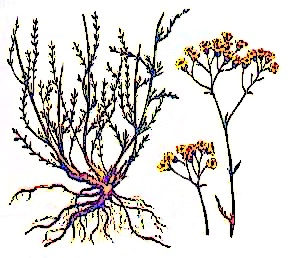
- Botanical illustration

Scientific classification
- Kingdom: Plantae
- Clade: Embryophytes
- Clade: Tracheophytes
- Clade: Angiosperms
- Clade: Eudicots
- Clade: Asterids
- Order: Asterales
- Family: Asteraceae
- Genus: Achillea
- Species: A. glaberrima

Binomial name
- Achillea glaberrima Klokov

= Achillea glaberrima =

Species of flowering plant

Achillea glaberrima is a species of yarrow in the family Asteraceae, native to southeastern Ukraine. A cultivar, 'Gold Spray', is available.
