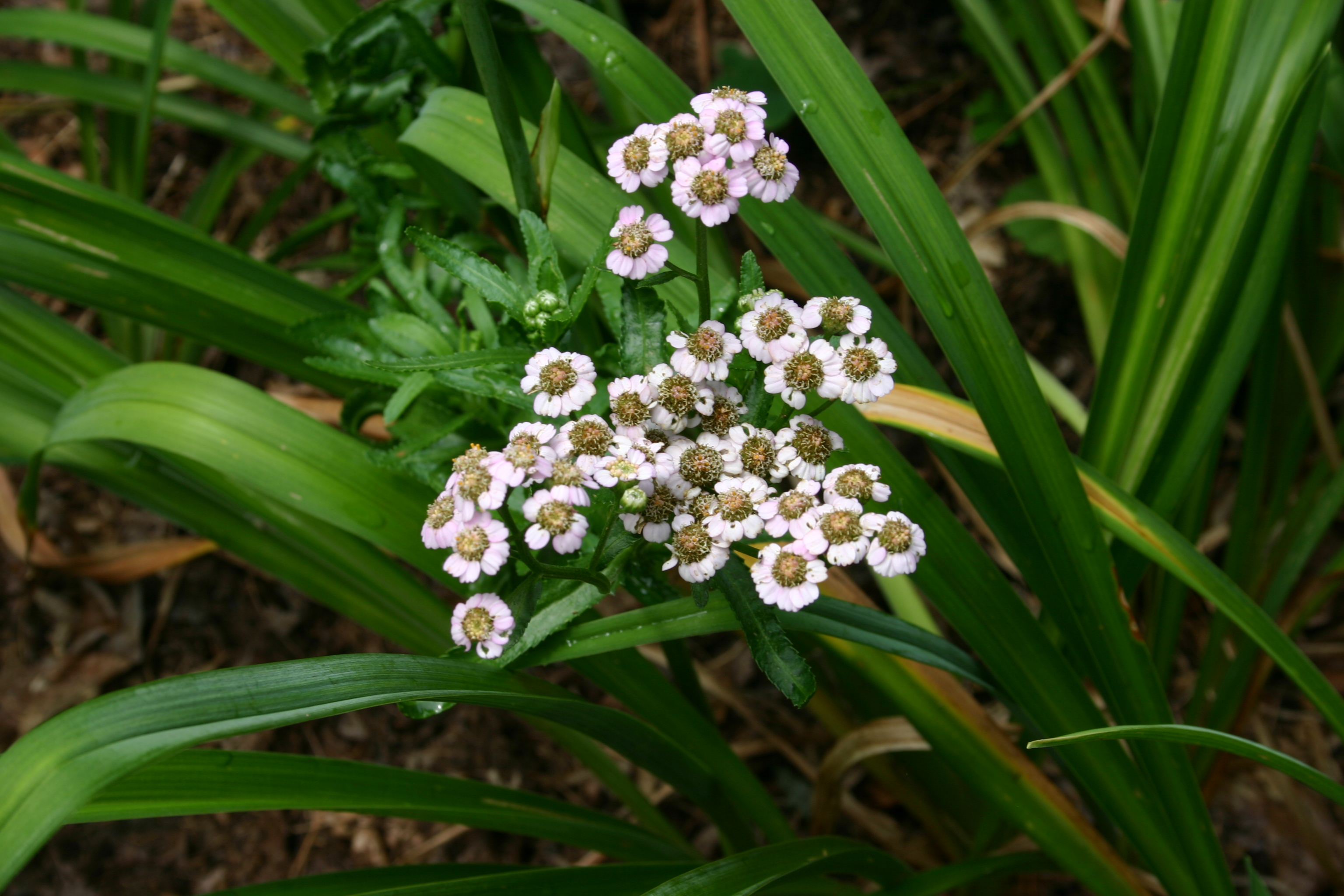

Conservation status
- Secure (NatureServe)

Scientific classification
- Kingdom: Plantae
- Clade: Tracheophytes
- Clade: Angiosperms
- Clade: Eudicots
- Clade: Asterids
- Order: Asterales
- Family: Asteraceae
- Genus: Achillea
- Species: A. alpina

Binomial name
- Achillea alpina L.

Synonyms
- Synonymy: Achillea angustifolia Salisb.; Achillea bocconii W.D.J.Koch; Achillea cristata Willd.; Achillea denticulata Besser ex Heimerl; Achillea depressa Fisch. ex Herder; Achillea mongolica Fisch. ex Spreng.; Achillea multiflora Hook.; Achillea punctata Moench; Achillea ramosissima Moench; Achillea sibirica Ledeb.; Achillea squarrosa Hassk.; Achillea subcartilaginea (Heimerl) Heimerl; Ptarmica mongolica (Fisch. ex Spreng.) DC.; Ptarmica sibirica Ledeb.

= Achillea alpina =

Species of yarrow

Achillea alpina
- Chinese: 高山蓍
Transcriptions
Standard Mandarin
- Hanyu Pinyin: gāoshānshī
- IPA: [káʊ.ʂán.ʂɻ̩́]
Yue: Cantonese
- Yale Romanization: gōu-sāan-sī

Achillea alpina, commonly known as alpine yarrow, Chinese yarrow or Siberian yarrow, is an Asian and North American species of plant in the sunflower family.

== Description ==
Achillea alpina is a perennial herb growing up to 80 centimetres (31 inches) tall. The foliage is simply pinnatifid with narrow closely set segments.

The flowers are white to pale violet, with both ray florets and disc florets.

Subspecies and varieties

- Achillea alpina subsp. camtschatica (Heimerl) Kitam.
- Achillea alpina var. discoidea (Regel) Kitam.
- Achillea alpina subsp. japonica (Heimerl) Kitam.
- Achillea alpina subsp. pulchra (Koidz.) Kitam.
- Achillea alpina subsp. subcartilaginea (Heimerl) Kitam.

== Distribution and habitat ==
The species is native to Siberia, the Russian Far East, China, Mongolia, Korea, Japan, Nepal, Canada (including Yukon and Northwest Territories), and the northern United States (Alaska, northern North Dakota, northern Minnesota).

It is found growing in thickets and along shorelines in northwestern North America and it reaches its most southernly distribution in northern Minnesota near the Canadian border where isolated populations are found growing in a peat meadows at the margins of aspen trees, open woods, woodland edges, stream banks, and roadsides.

== Conservation ==
In Minnesota, it was listed as a threatened species in 1996.
