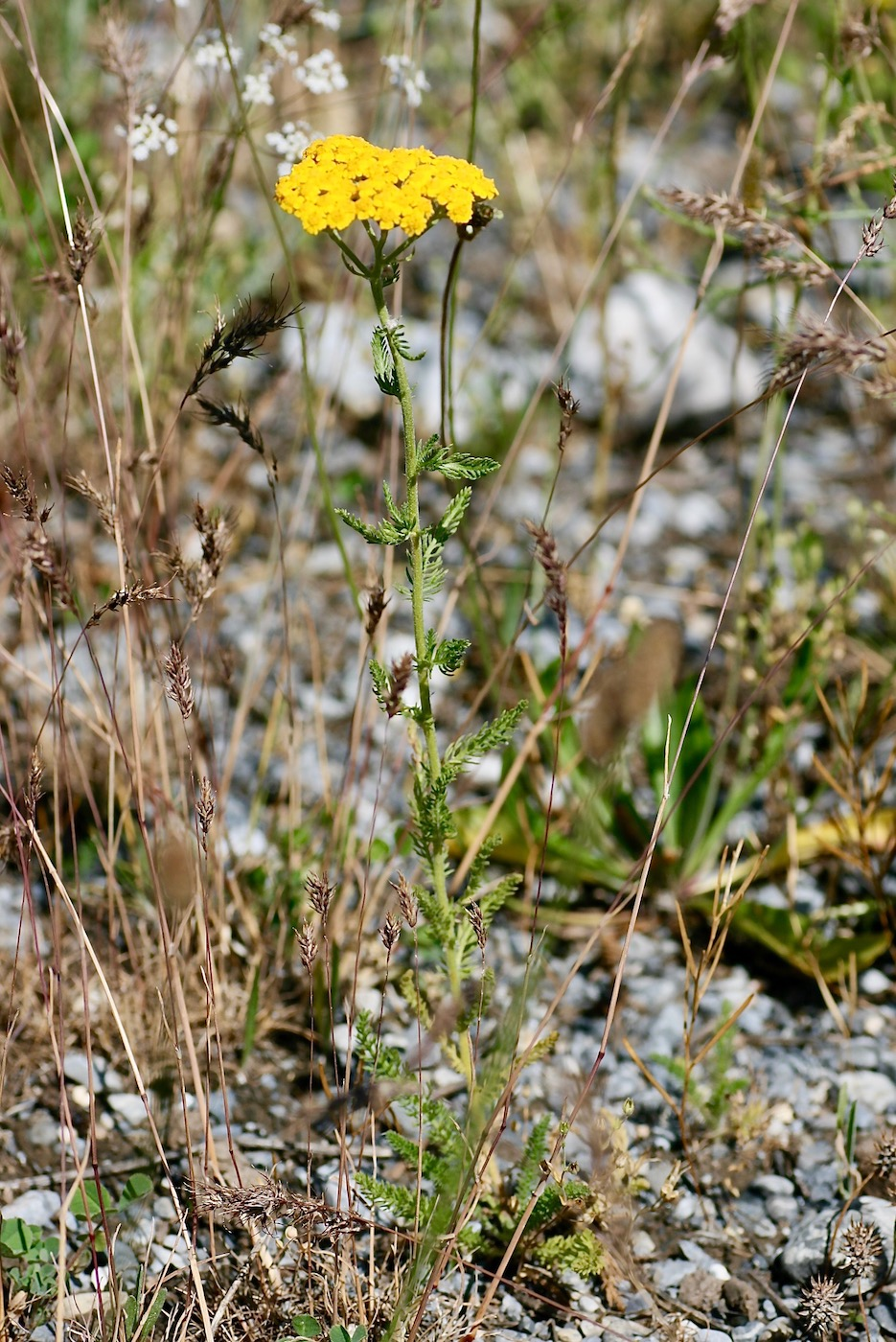

Scientific classification
- Kingdom: Plantae
- Clade: Tracheophytes
- Clade: Angiosperms
- Clade: Eudicots
- Clade: Asterids
- Order: Asterales
- Family: Asteraceae
- Genus: Achillea
- Species: A. arabica

Binomial name
- Achillea arabica Kotschy

Synonyms
- Achillea biebersteinii Afanasiev; Achillea micrantha f. tenuisecta Heimerl ex Nábělek

= Achillea arabica =

Species of yarrow

Achillea arabica is a species of flowering plant belonging to the family Asteraceae. It is native to parts of the Middle East, Western Asia, Southern Russia and Bulgaria.
