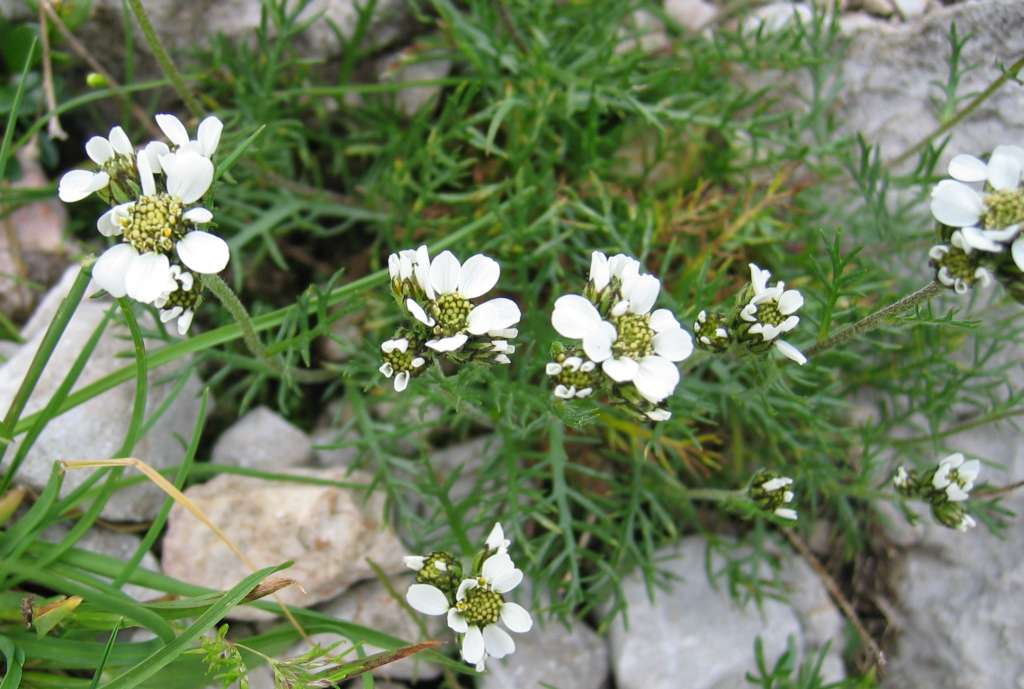

Scientific classification
- Kingdom: Plantae
- Clade: Tracheophytes
- Clade: Angiosperms
- Clade: Eudicots
- Clade: Asterids
- Order: Asterales
- Family: Asteraceae
- Genus: Achillea
- Species: A. atrata

Binomial name
- Achillea atrata L.

Synonyms
- Achillea halleri Crantz; Anthemis corymbosa Haenke; Chamaemelum atratum (L.) E.H.L.Krause; Ptarmica atrata (L.) DC.

= Achillea atrata =

Species of yarrow

Achillea atrata, commonly called black yarrow or dark stemmed sneezewort, is a European species of herbaceous perennial flowering plant native to the Alpine regions of Switzerland, France, Italy, Germany, Austria, and Slovenia.
