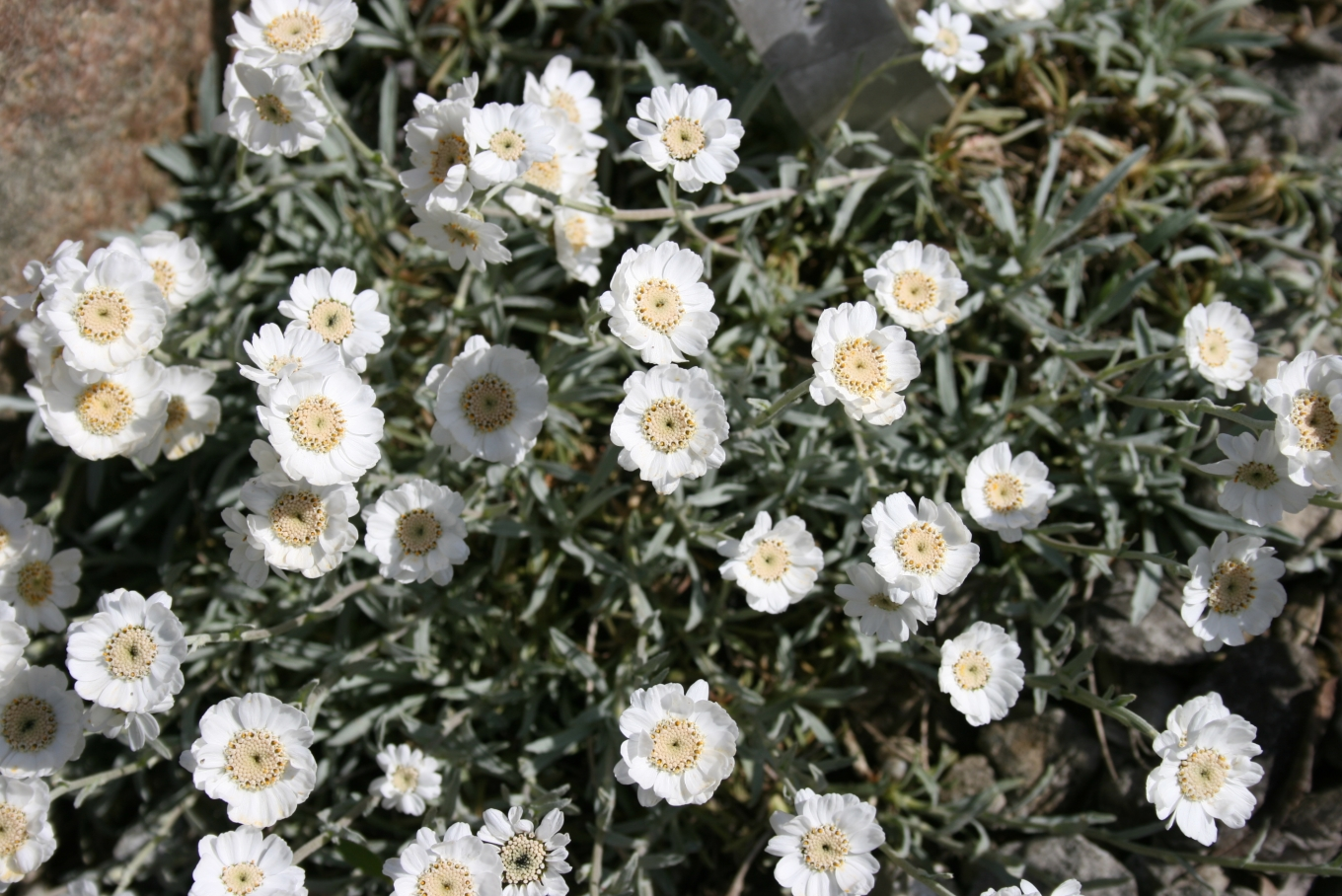
- Flowers

Scientific classification
- Kingdom: Plantae
- Clade: Tracheophytes
- Clade: Angiosperms
- Clade: Eudicots
- Clade: Asterids
- Order: Asterales
- Family: Asteraceae
- Genus: Achillea
- Species: A. cretica

Binomial name
- Achillea cretica L.

Synonyms
- Achillea erioclada DC.; Achillea santolina Sm.; Santolina anthemoides L.

= Achillea cretica =

Species of flowering plant

Achillea cretica, Cretan yarrow, is a species of flowering plant in the family Asteraceae, native to Greece, the East Aegean Islands, Crete, Turkey, and Cyprus. It is typically found in calcareous rocky areas such as cliffs, gorges, scree fields, and even ancient ruins, and is somewhat tolerant of salty conditions.
