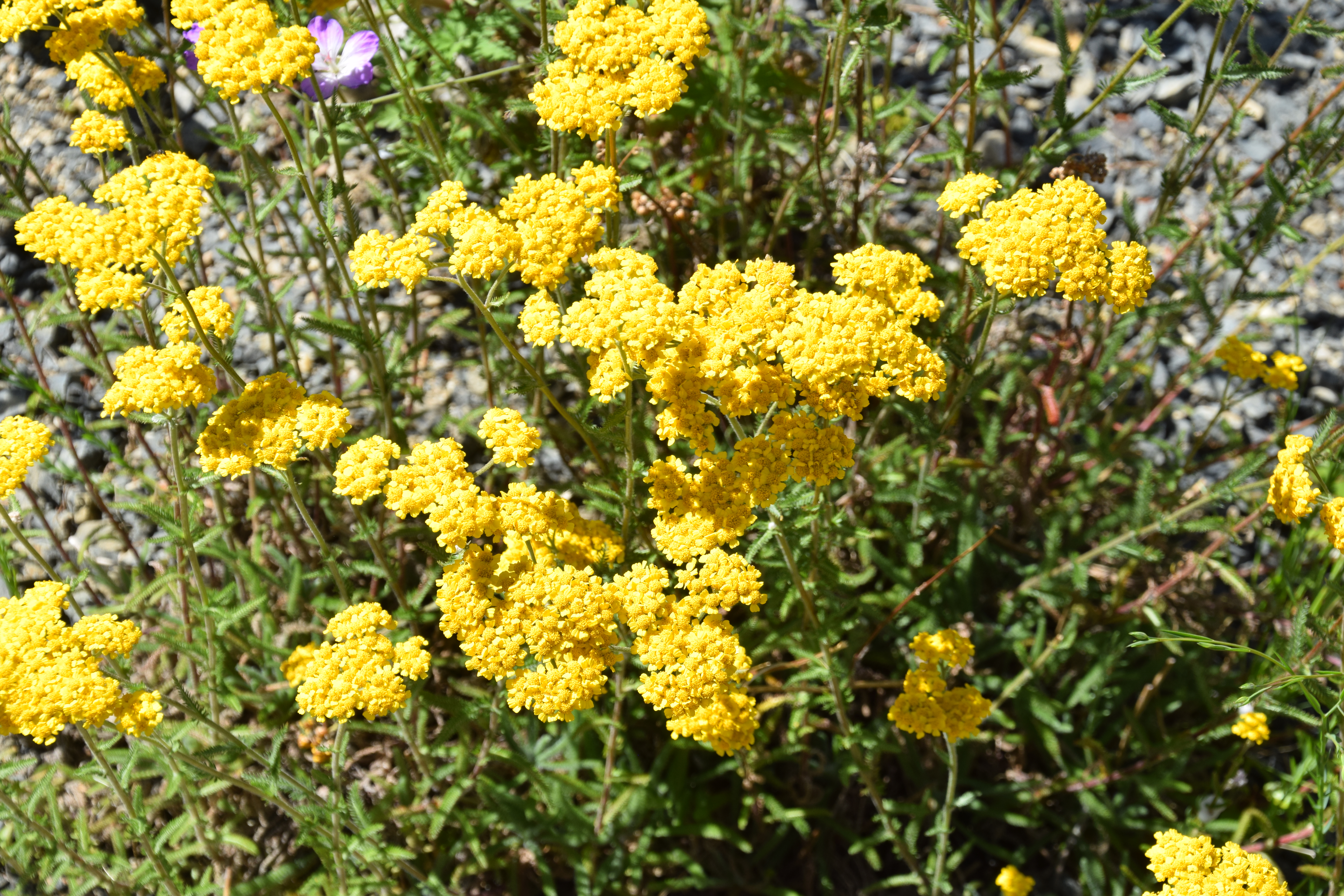

Scientific classification
- Kingdom: Plantae
- Clade: Tracheophytes
- Clade: Angiosperms
- Clade: Eudicots
- Clade: Asterids
- Order: Asterales
- Family: Asteraceae
- Genus: Achillea
- Species: A. tomentosa

Binomial name
- Achillea tomentosa L. (Note: Achillea tomentosa Pursh is a synonym of Achillea millefolium var. occidentalis DC.)

Synonyms
- Alitubus tomentosus (L.) Dulac; Chamaemelum tomentosum (L.) E. H. L. Krause; Millefolium tomentosum (L.) Fourr.

= Achillea tomentosa =

Species of yarrow

Achillea tomentosa, commonly known as woolly yarrow, is a flowering plant in the family Asteraceae. It is sometimes kept as a garden plant, and occasionally naturalizes outside its original range of dry lowland habitats of southern Europe and (possibly) western Asia. It is a recipient of the Royal Horticultural Society's Award of Garden Merit.

== Description ==
Achillea tomentosa is quite similar in appearance to Achillea millefolium (common yarrow), but typically has yellow ligules, more numerous disc florets, and straw‑colored involucral bracts with translucent margins. Additionally, A. tomentosa is diploid, unlike the polyploid common yarrow.

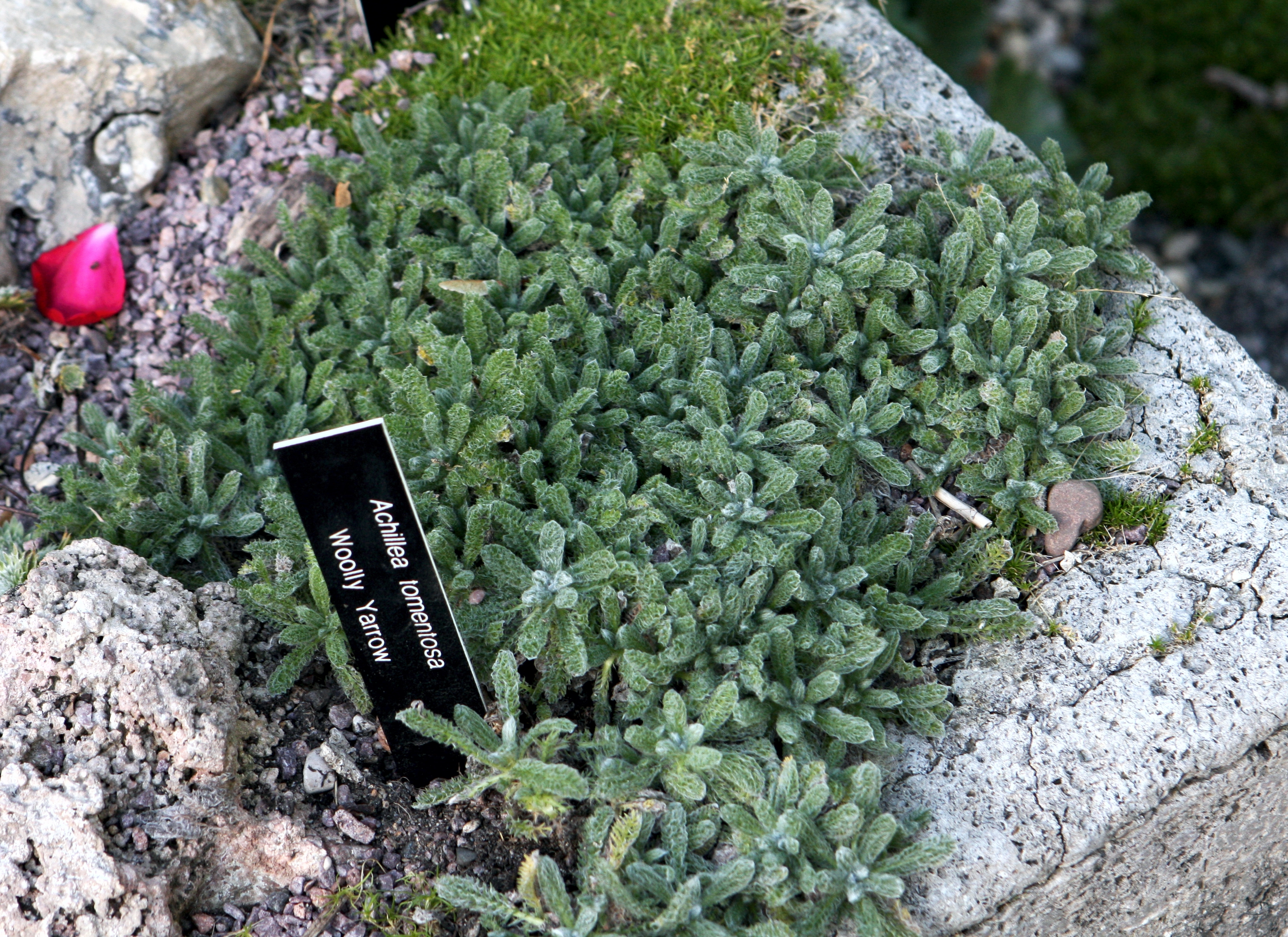
Foliage
