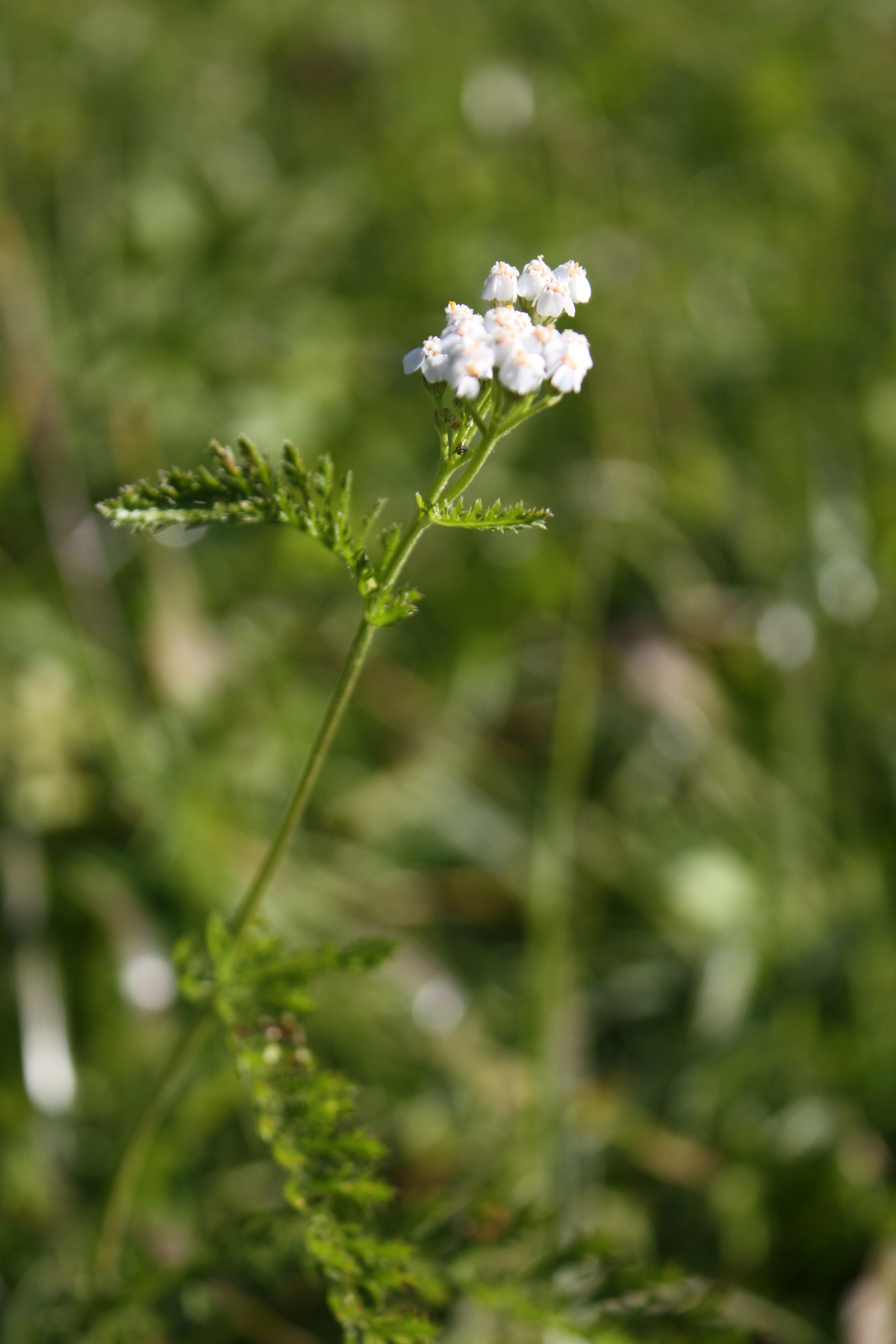
- Achillea pratensis near Merano

Scientific classification
- Kingdom: Plantae
- Clade: Tracheophytes
- Clade: Angiosperms
- Clade: Eudicots
- Clade: Asterids
- Order: Asterales
- Family: Asteraceae
- Genus: Achillea
- Species: A. pratensis

Binomial name
- Achillea pratensis Saukel & Länger

= Achillea pratensis =

Species of plant

Achillea pratensis is a herbaceous perennial flowering plant in the sunflower family. It is closely related to A. millefolium and found in Europe.

== Description ==
Achillea pratensis has pinnate leaves with a low number of leaflets compared to A. millefolium and related species (15 per side on average). The inflorescence is comparatively loose. The plant is tetraploid.

== Distribution and habitat ==
It is found in Austria, Bavaria South Tyrol, and Slovakia.
