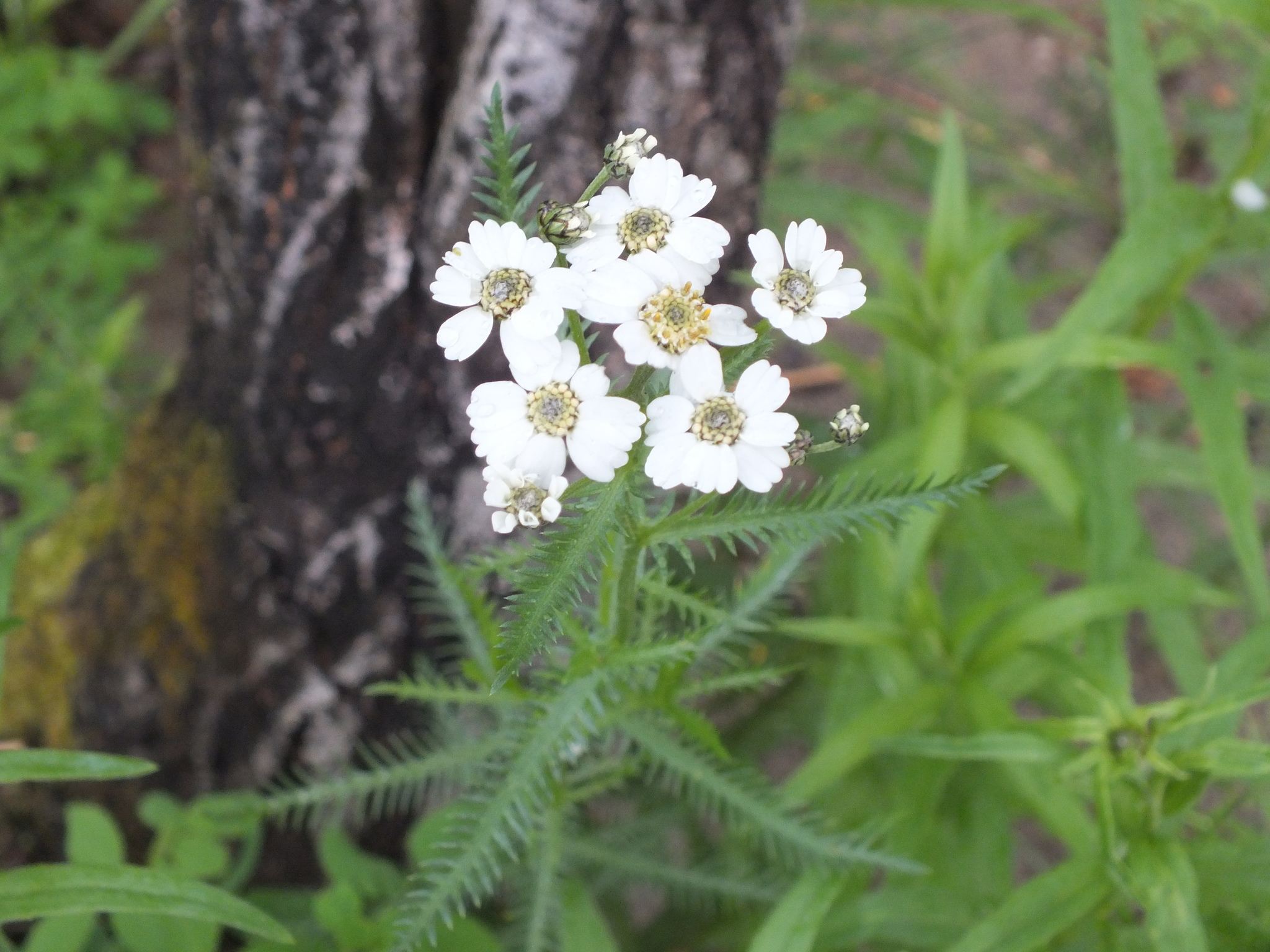

Scientific classification
- Kingdom: Plantae
- Clade: Tracheophytes
- Clade: Angiosperms
- Clade: Eudicots
- Clade: Asterids
- Order: Asterales
- Family: Asteraceae
- Genus: Achillea
- Species: A. impatiens

Binomial name
- Achillea impatiens L., 1753

= Achillea impatiens =

Species of yarrow

Achillea impatiens is a species of flowering plant belonging to the family Asteraceae. It is native to Central Russia, Mongolia, Kazakhstan, Northwestern China, and Romania.
