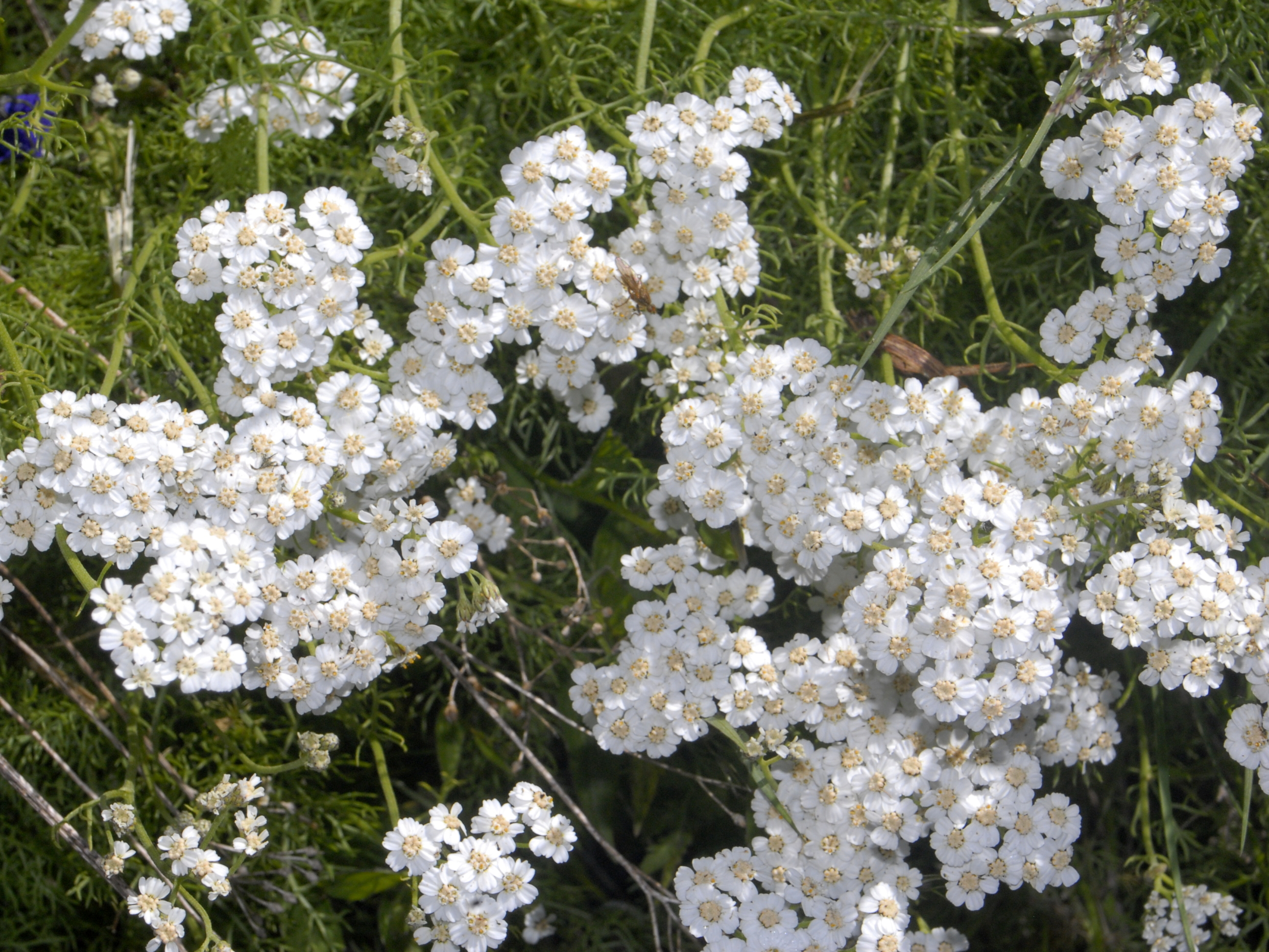
- Achillea abrotanoides at the Giardino Botanico Alpino Chanousia

Scientific classification
- Kingdom: Plantae
- Clade: Tracheophytes
- Clade: Angiosperms
- Clade: Eudicots
- Clade: Asterids
- Order: Asterales
- Family: Asteraceae
- Genus: Achillea
- Species: A. abrotanoides

Binomial name
- Achillea abrotanoides (Vis.) Vis.

Synonyms
- Achillea atrata subsp. carvifolia Dörfl. & Hayek; Achillea montenegrina Beck & Szyszył.; Ptarmica abrotanoides Vis.; Ptarmica abrodanoides Vis.; Ptarmica multifida subsp. abrotanoides (Vis.) Nyman

= Achillea abrotanoides =

Species of yarrow

Achillea abrotanoides is a herbaceous perennial flowering plant in the sunflower family. It is native to southeastern Europe.

== Description ==
Achillea abrotanoides can reach a height of about 20–40 centimetres (8–15 1/2 in). The stem is subglabrous to tomentose. The leaves are alternate, grey-green, 1–3 cm (1/2–1 1/4 in) long, hairy, and pinnatifid (or bipinnatifid). The plant blooms from June to August, with many-stellate white flowers.

== Distribution and habitat ==
This species is native to southeastern Europe (Greece, Albania, Croatia, Macedonia, etc.).

It prefers mountain regions with stony or rocky areas and debris.
