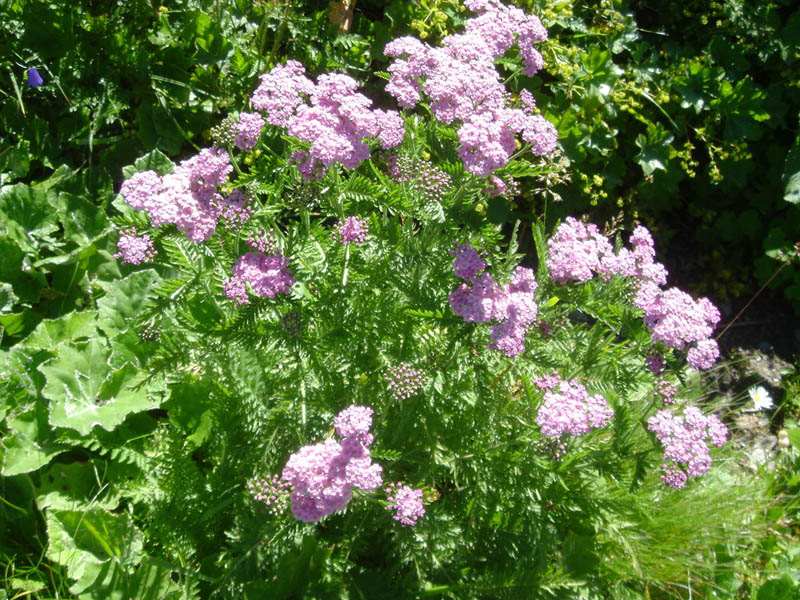
- Achillea distans subsp. tanacetifolia

Scientific classification
- Kingdom: Plantae
- Clade: Tracheophytes
- Clade: Angiosperms
- Clade: Eudicots
- Clade: Asterids
- Order: Asterales
- Family: Asteraceae
- Genus: Achillea
- Species: A. distans

Binomial name
- Achillea distans Waldst. & Kit. ex Willd.
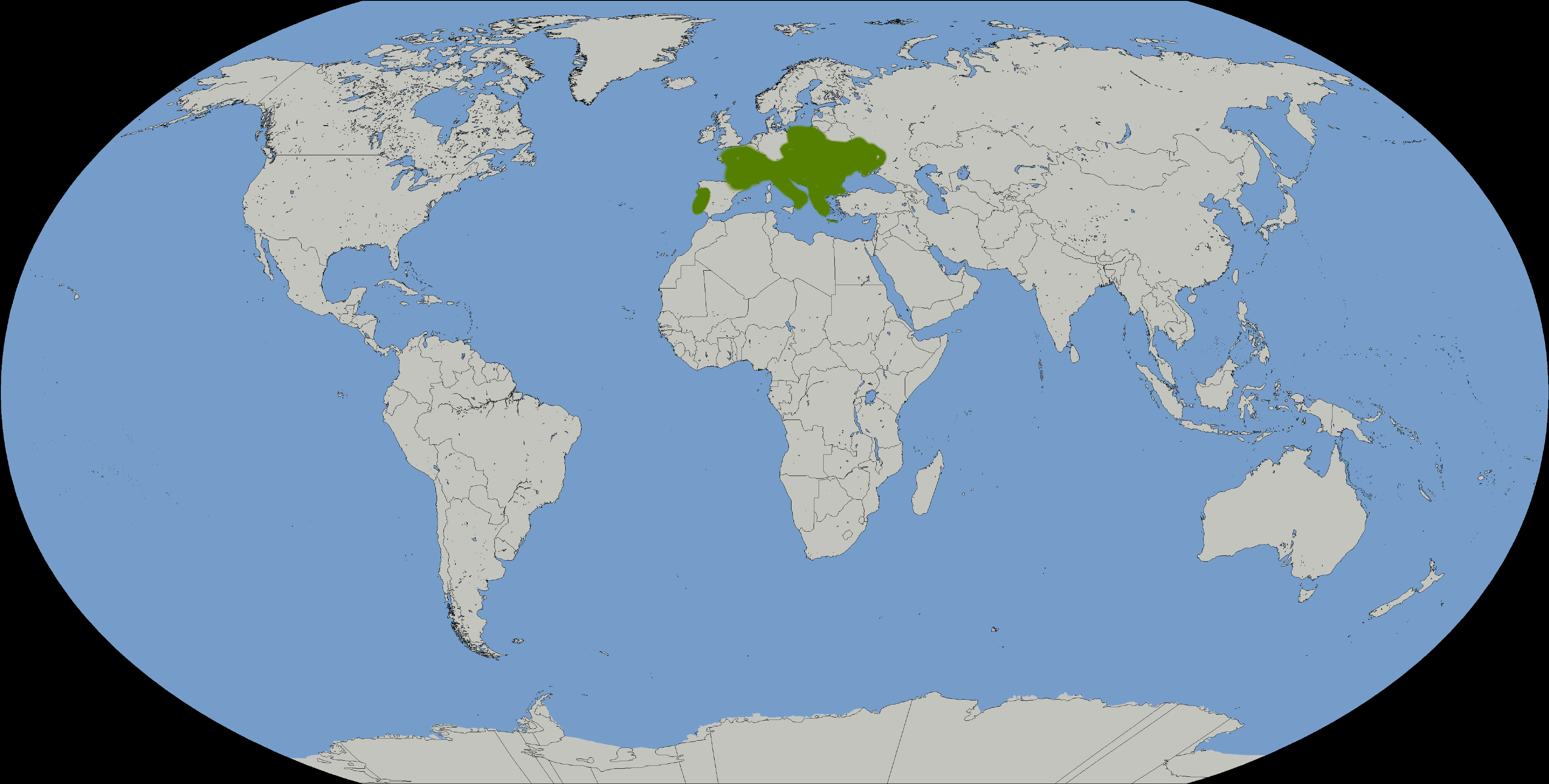
- Native range of Achillea distans, marked green

= Achillea distans =

Species of perennial plant

Achillea distans is a perennial species of Achillea in the family Asteraceae. It is native to Europe.

== Description ==
It is a perennial plant that grows up to 60 centimetres (24 in) tall.

== Distribution and habitat ==
It is native to Europe and grows in the temperate biome. It can be found in light forests, on rocky forest edges and in shrubs. It also grows in meadows and fertile habitats.
