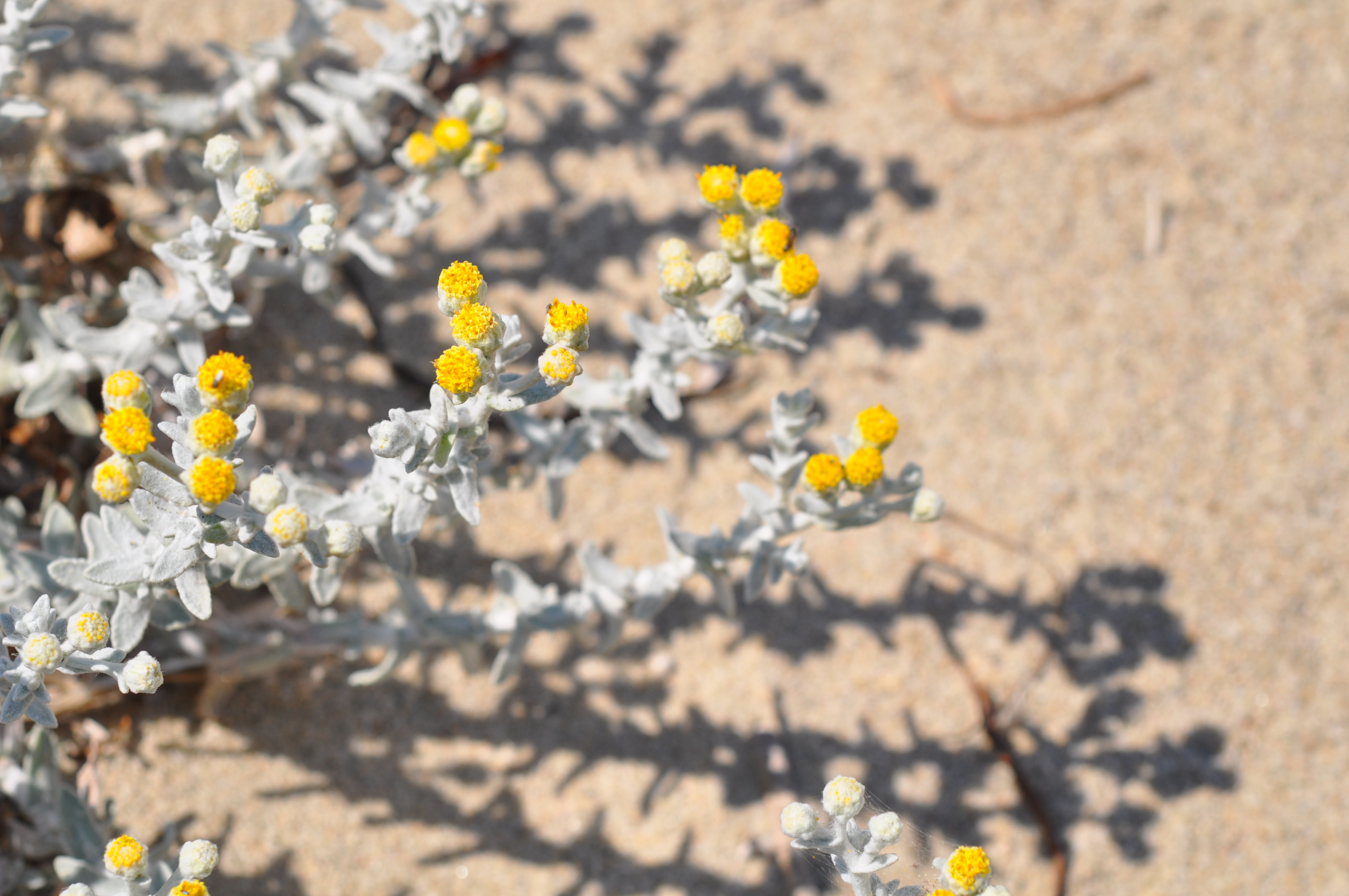

Scientific classification
- Kingdom: Plantae
- Clade: Tracheophytes
- Clade: Angiosperms
- Clade: Eudicots
- Clade: Asterids
- Order: Asterales
- Family: Asteraceae
- Genus: Achillea
- Species: A. maritima

Binomial name
- Achillea maritima (L.) Ehrend. & Y.P.Guo (2005)

Synonyms
- Filago maritima L. (1753); Athanasia maritima (L.) L. (1763); Santolina maritima (L.) Crantz (1766); Diotis maritima (L.) Sm. (1825); Otanthus maritimus (L.) Hoffmanns. & Link (1834)

= Achillea maritima =

Species of plant

Achillea maritima, commonly known as cottonweed or sea cottonweed, is an evergreen, woolly perennial subshrub in the family Asteraceae. The species is specialized to maritime environments, and survives extreme coastal conditions such as salt spray, shifting sand dunes and winds. It is distributed across the coastlines of the Mediterranean Basin, the Atlantic shores of Western Europe, the Canary Islands, and parts of the Black Sea and Caucasus.

== Infraspecific taxa ==
Two distinct subspecies are recognized:

- A. maritima subsp. maritima – native throughout most of the species' range.
- A. maritima subsp. atlantica – native to northwestern Africa.

== Description ==
Achillea maritima forms a bushy, heavily branched cushion or mound that typically ranges between 10 and 50 cm (3.9 and 19.7 in) in height. The entire plant, including stems, leaves, and outer flower structures, is covered in a dense, white to silver-grey woolly covering composed of highly interwoven tresses (a tomentose indumentum). The foliage consists of small, alternate, fleshy leaves measuring 5 to 17 mm in length. The leaves are oblong to oblong-lanceolate, sessile (lacking a petiole), and feature smooth or subtly toothed margins. When bruised, the foliage releases a strong herbal fragrance.

The blooming period lasts from June through September. The inflorescence is composed of subglobose flower heads (capitula) measuring 8 to 12 mm wide, which are arranged in terminal clusters (corymbs) of 2 to 8. The capitula completely lack outer ray florets (petals); they are composed of tiny, bright yellow, tubular disc florets. The resulting fruits are curved, straw-colored achenes measuring 4 to 5 mm, which completely lack a bristly pappus.

== Distribution, habitat, and conservation ==
The species is naturally found growing on maritime sand dunes, shingle beaches, and coastal sand bars. Its native range is the coastal zones of the subtropical and temperate Western Palearctic: Its native range extends along the Atlantic coast of western Europe and throughout much of the Mediterranean region, including North Africa and the eastern Mediterranean. It also occurs in the Canary Islands and parts of the Black Sea region.

The species has declined in parts of its range as a result of disturbance to coastal dune habitats. Highly isolated remaining populations on the northwestern limits of its range, such as those at Lady's Island Lake in County Wexford, Ireland, are targets of active conservation management to protect remaining dune systems from foot traffic and mechanical disturbance.
