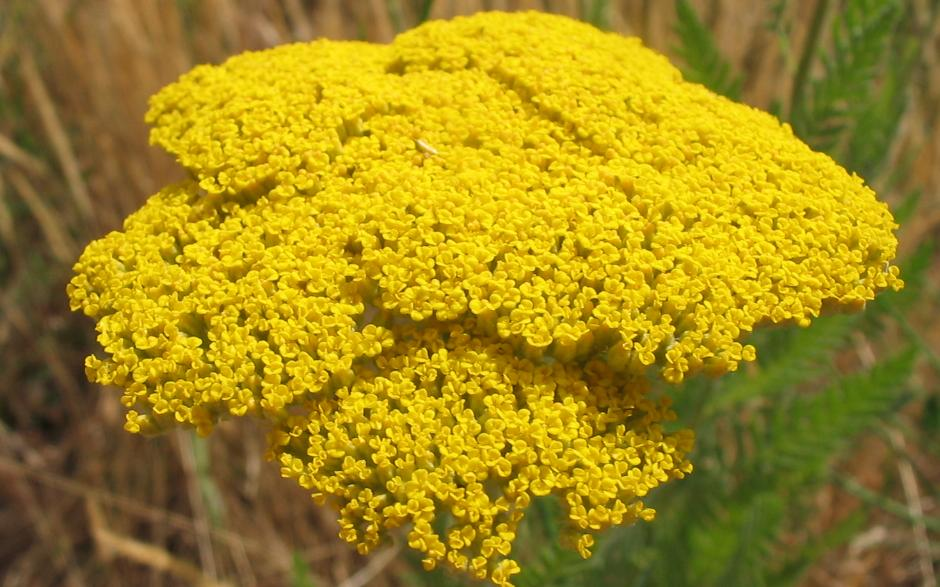

Scientific classification
- Kingdom: Plantae
- Clade: Tracheophytes
- Clade: Angiosperms
- Clade: Eudicots
- Clade: Asterids
- Order: Asterales
- Family: Asteraceae
- Genus: Achillea
- Species: A. filipendulina

Binomial name
- Achillea filipendulina Lam.

Synonyms
- Achillea eupatorium M.Bieb.; Achillea filicifolia M.Bieb.; Tanacetum angulatum Willd.

= Achillea filipendulina =

Species of yarrow

Achillea filipendulina, the yarrow, fernleaf yarrow, milfoil, or nosebleed, is an Asian species of flowering plant in the sunflower family.

== Description ==
A herbaceous perennial, the plant grows 120 centimetres (4 feet) high, with fern-like foliage. The leaves are linear, pinnate, lobed and serrated, hairy and rough.

The flowers are arranged in corymbs, or panicles, of a complex character; they are very large, often 13 cm (5 inches) across. The smaller corymbs are arched or convex, causing the cluster or compound corymb to present an uneven surface. The small flowers are of rich 'old gold' yellow colour, and are very rigid, almost hard. The flowering period is mid to late summer.

== Distribution and habitat ==
The species is native to central and southwestern Asia (Kazakhstan, Afghanistan, Pakistan, Iran, Iraq, Turkey, Caucasus). It is also naturalized in parts of Europe and North America.

== Cultivation ==
Achillea filipendulina is cultivated in temperate regions as a flowering ornamental plant. Ordinary garden loam and other soils support its growth. It is best grown in full sun, and is drought tolerant when established. Propagation is by seed or root division in spring.

The species has generally been superseded by numerous improved cultivars, of which the following have gained the Royal Horticultural Society's Award of Garden Merit:-

- 'Coronation Gold'
- 'Credo'
- 'Cloth of Gold'
- 'Gold Plate'
- 'Heidi'
- 'Hella Glashoff'
- 'Lachsschönheit' (Galaxy Series)
- Achillea × lewisii 'King Edward'
- 'Lucky Break'
- 'Martina'
- 'Mondpagode'
- 'Moonshine'
- 'Summerwine'
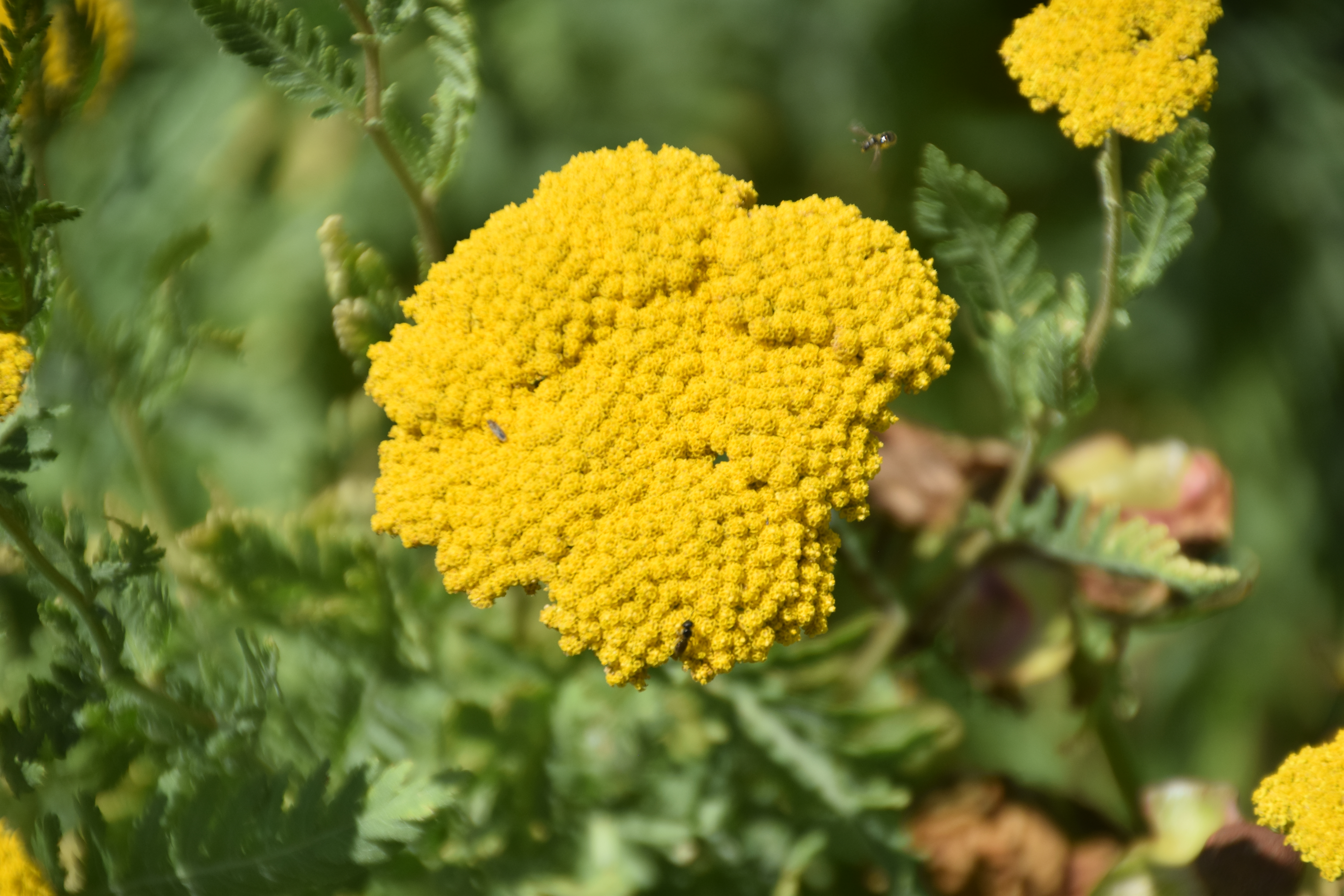
'Coronation Gold'

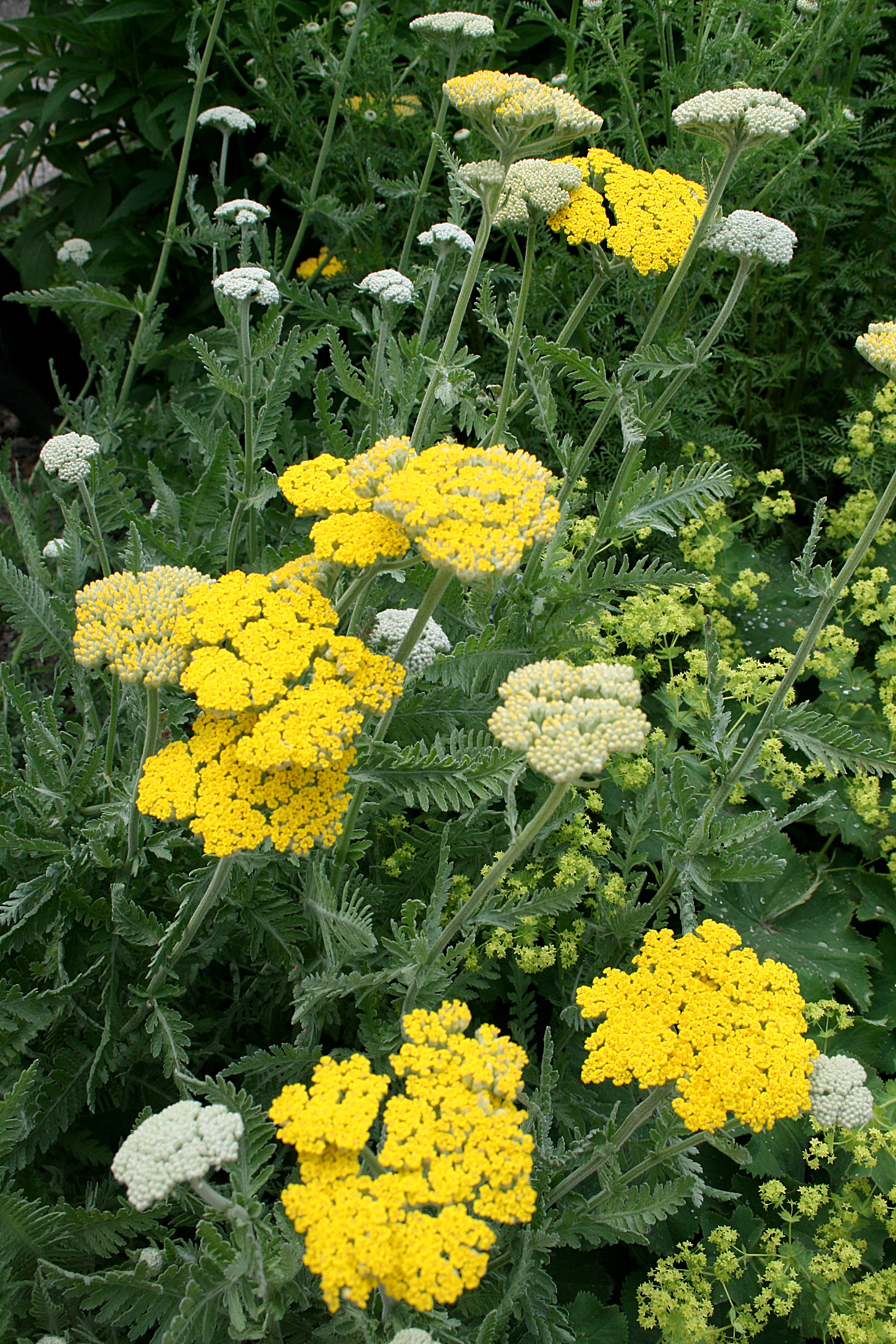
'Coronation Gold'

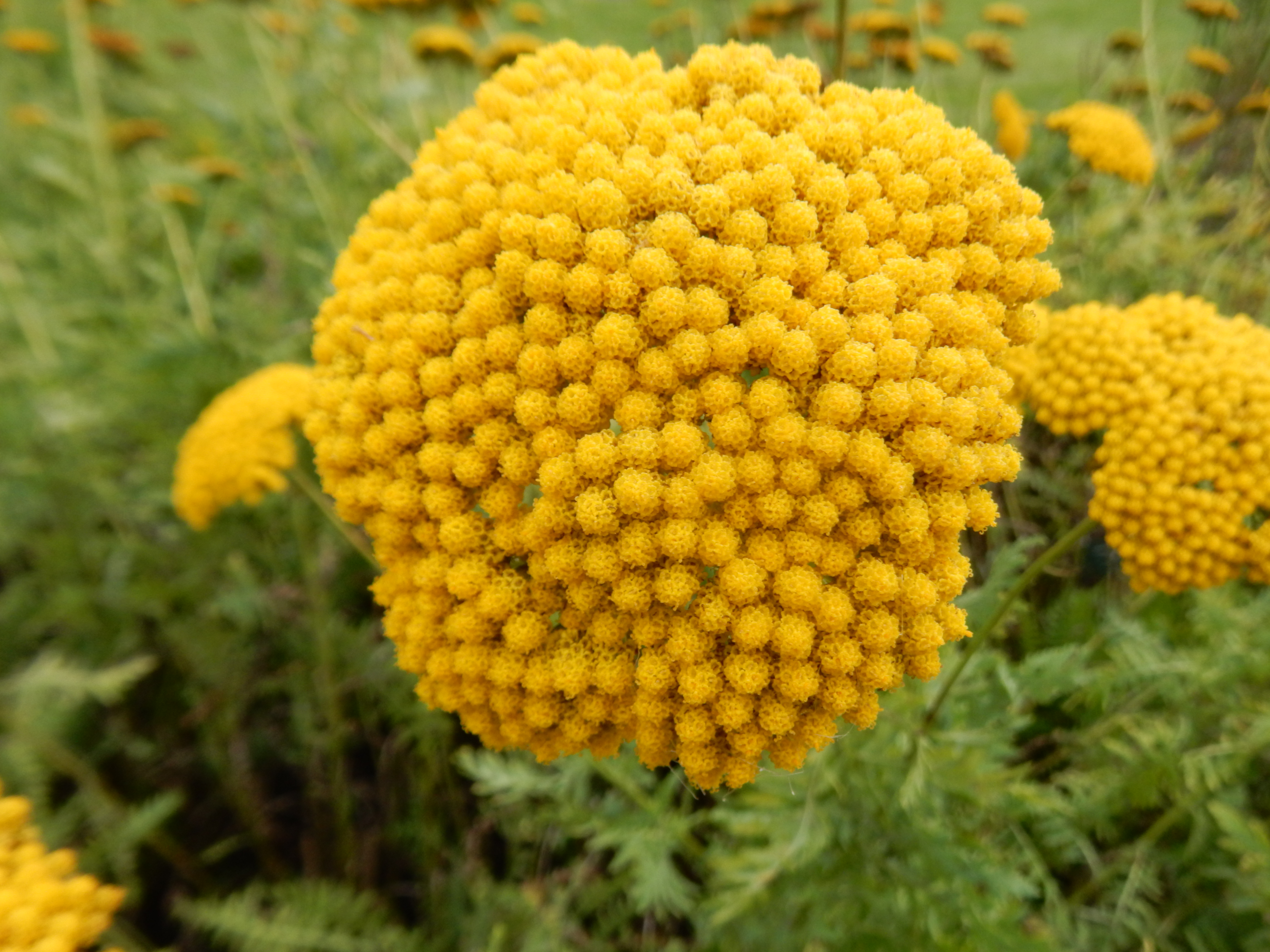
'Cloth of Gold'

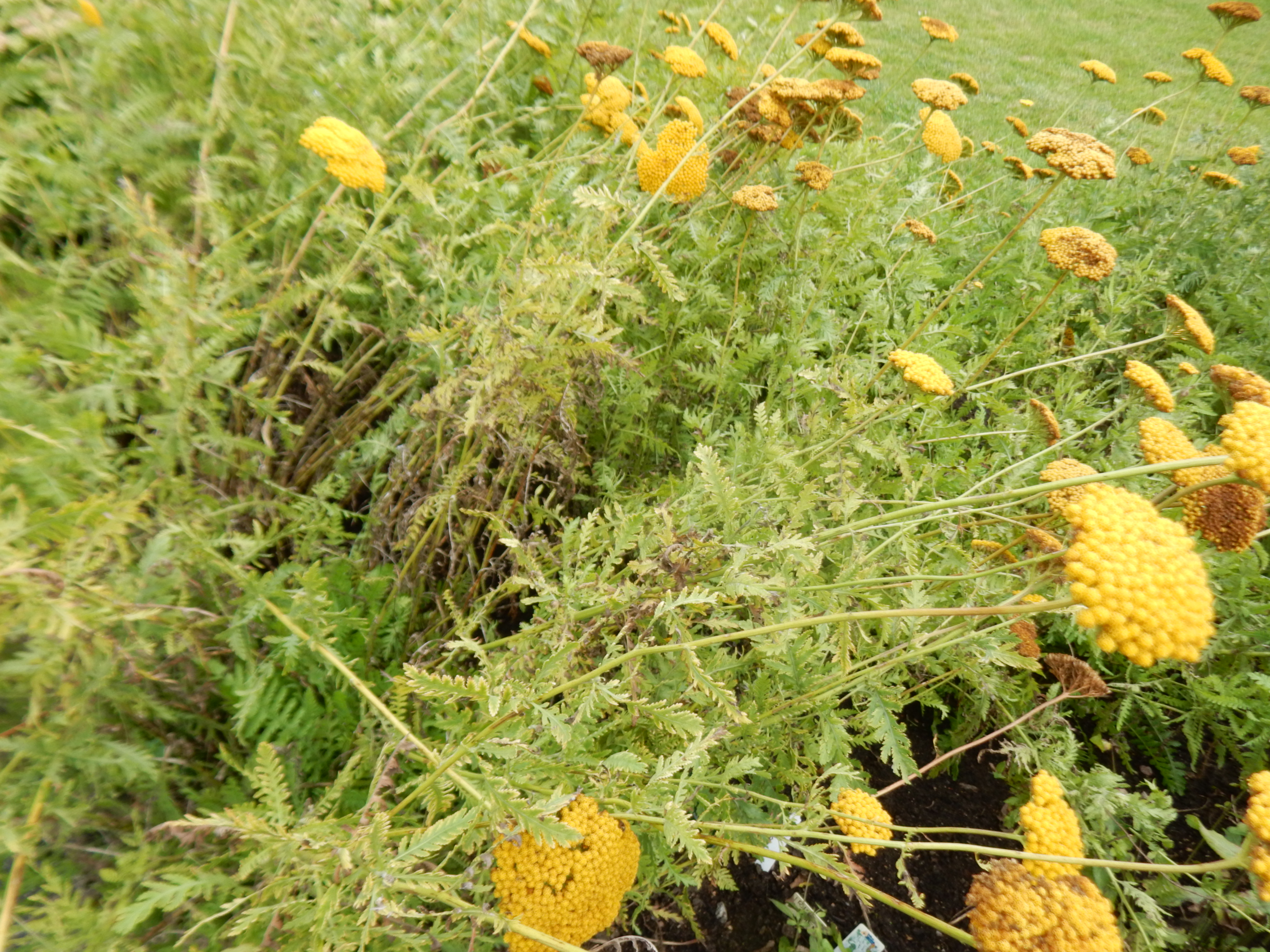
'Cloth of Gold'

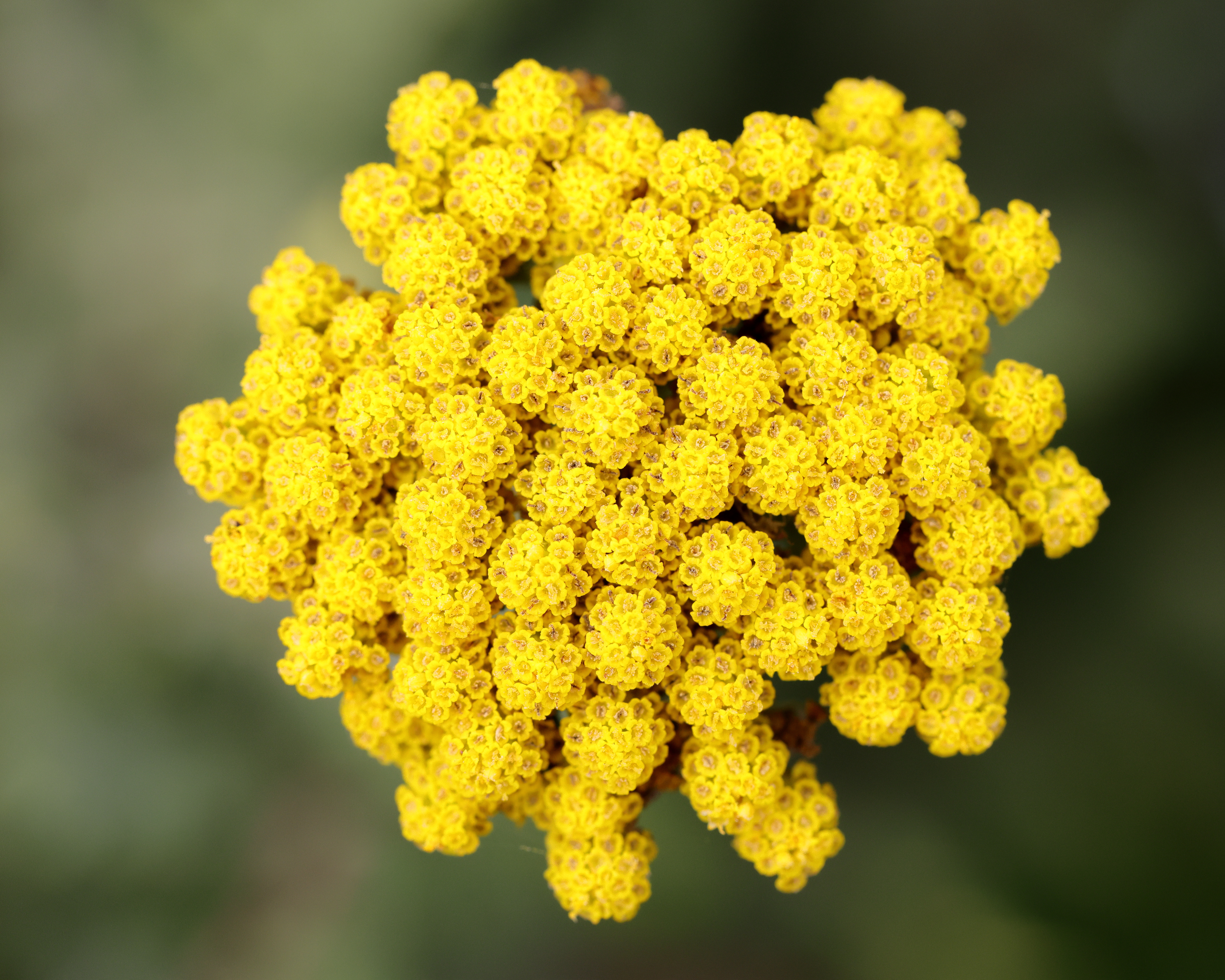
'Parker's Variety'

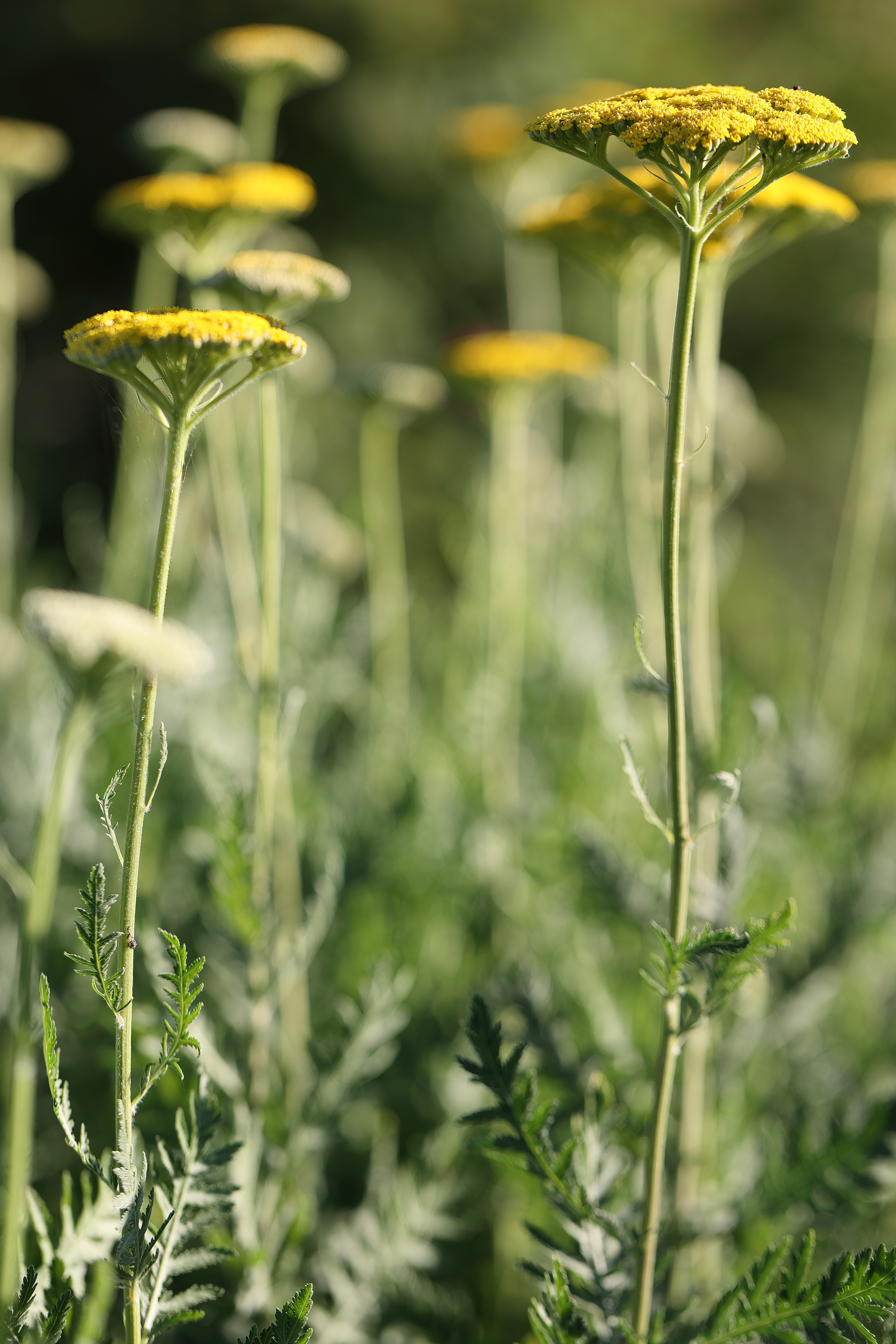
'Parker's Variety'
