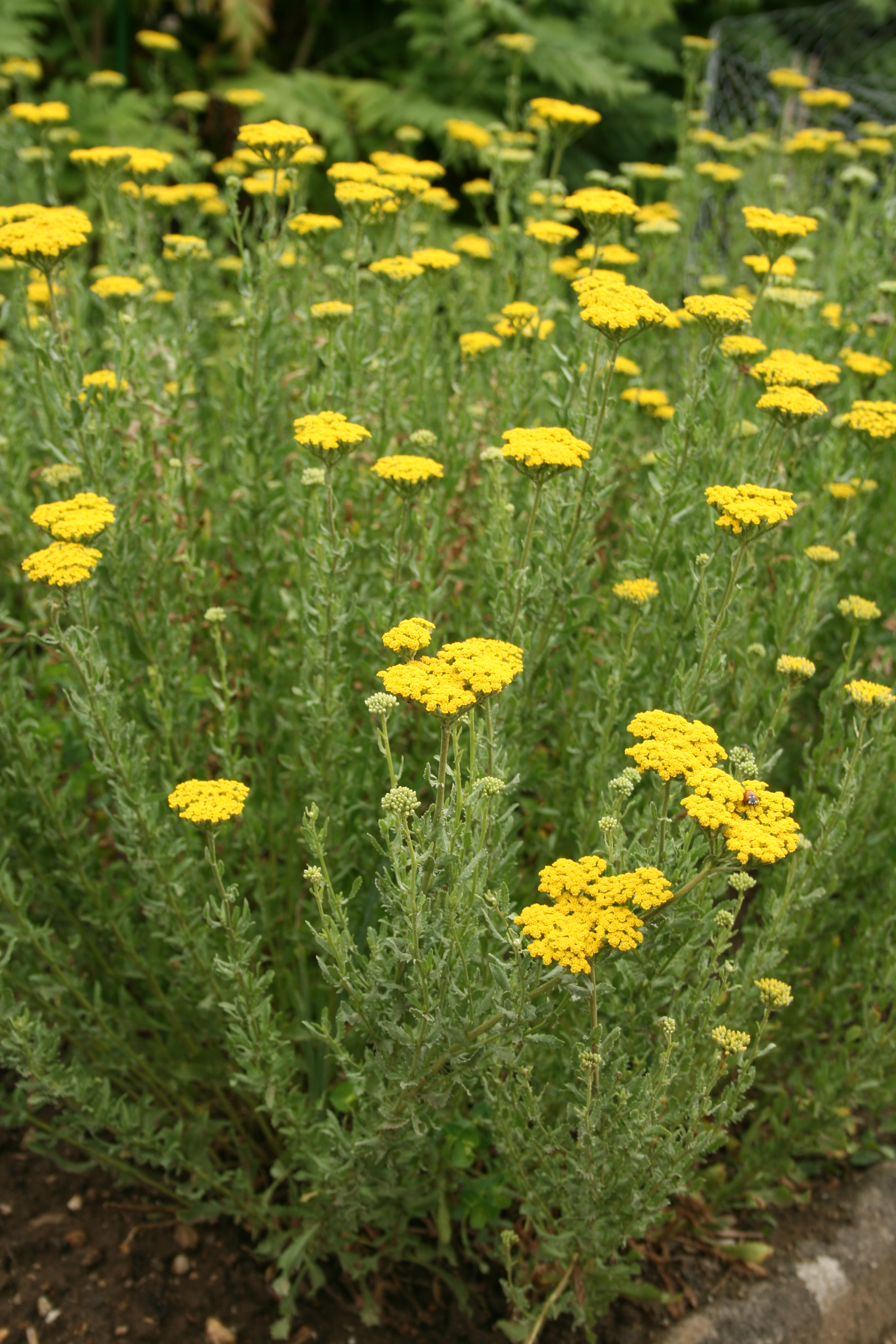

Scientific classification
- Kingdom: Plantae
- Clade: Embryophytes
- Clade: Tracheophytes
- Clade: Angiosperms
- Clade: Eudicots
- Clade: Asterids
- Order: Asterales
- Family: Asteraceae
- Genus: Achillea
- Species: A. ageratum

Binomial name
- Achillea ageratum L.

Synonyms
- Achillea viscosa Lam.; Conforata ageratum Fourr.; Santolina ageratum Baill.

= Achillea ageratum =

Species of flowering plant

Achillea ageratum, also known as sweet yarrow, sweet-Nancy, English mace, or sweet maudlin, is a species of flowering plant in the sunflower family.

== Description ==
The plant grows to a height of 30 to 46 centimetres (12 to 18 inches). A hardy perennial, it can be identified by its narrow and serrated leaves, and clusters of small flowers.

== Taxonomy ==
The plant was first given a species name by Carl Linnaeus and published in his Species Plantarum 1753.

=== Etymology ===
Achillea is a reference to the Greek hero Achilles, who was trained to use herbs by his mentor, the centaur Chiron. The flowers last for a relatively long period, hence the inclusion of ageratum in the species name.

== Distribution and habitat ==
The species is native to southern Europe and Morocco.

In the United States, the plant is cultivated in the state of New York and sparingly naturalized in a few places outside its native range.

== Uses ==
The leaves can be chopped and used raw as a herb, or added with other herbs to soups and stews. Modern uses of the herb include its use as a flavouring, as a dried flower, and as an ornamental herb.

In the Middle Ages it was used as a strewing herb to repel insects such as moths, lice and ticks and spread a good smell in private rooms.

== Sources ==
- Bailey, Liberty Hyde; Bailey, Ethel Zoe (1976). Hortus Third: A Concise Dictionary of Plants Cultivated in the United States and Canada. New York: Macmillan. ISBN 978-00250-5-470-7.
- Farrell, Holly (2019). The Kew Gardener's Guide to Growing Herbs. London: White Lion Publishing. ISBN 978-07112-3-936-4.
- Linford, Jenny (2011). The Ultimate Guide to Herbs. Bath, UK: Parragon Books. ISBN 978-14454-5-392-7.
- Quincy, John (1794). Lexicon physico-medicum (11th ed.). London: T. Longman. OCLC 1048314313.
