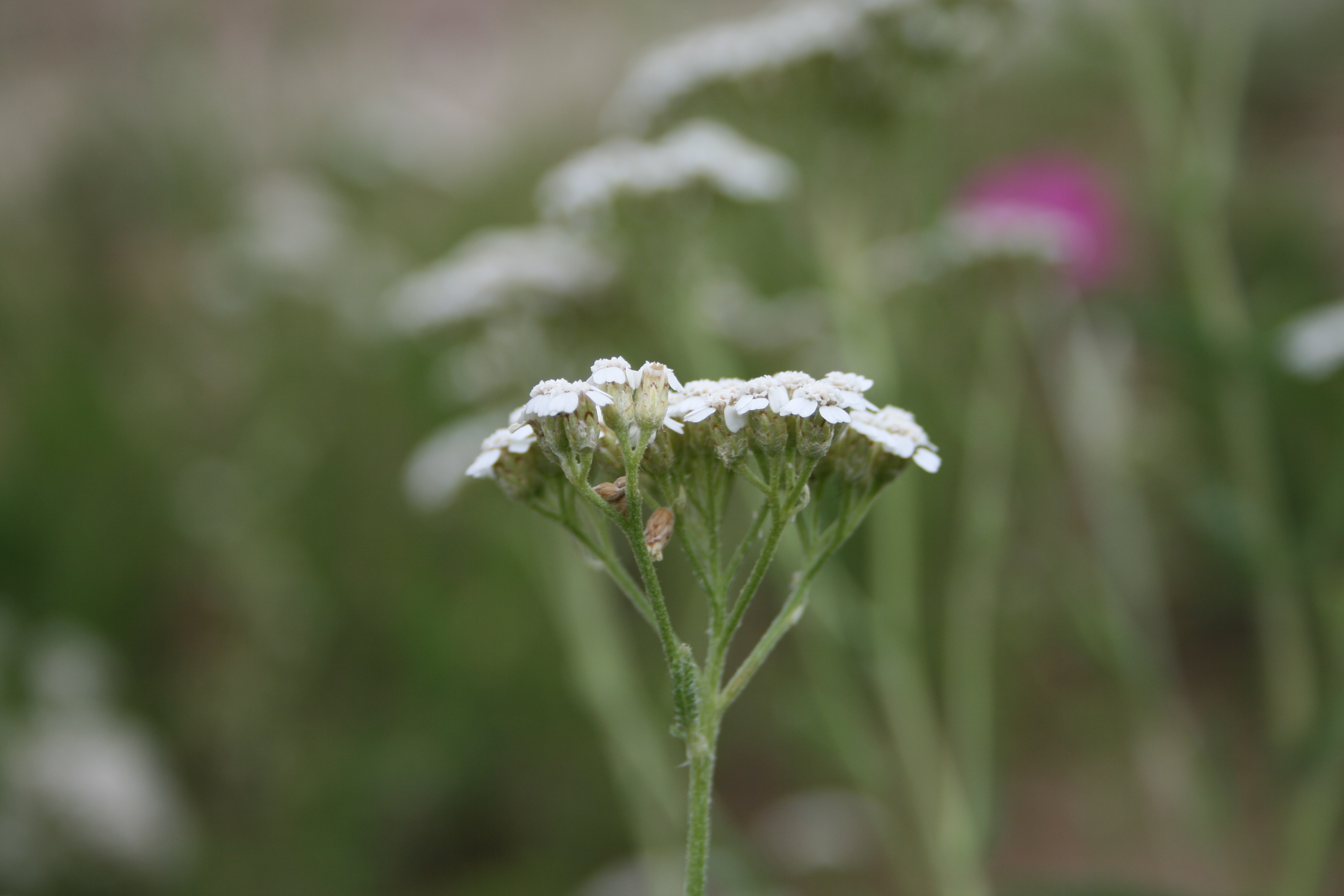

Scientific classification
- Kingdom: Plantae
- Clade: Embryophytes
- Clade: Tracheophytes
- Clade: Angiosperms
- Clade: Eudicots
- Clade: Asterids
- Order: Asterales
- Family: Asteraceae
- Genus: Achillea
- Species: A. collina

Binomial name
- Achillea collina (Wirtg.) Becker ex Heimerl

Synonyms
- Achillea millefolium var. collina Wirtg.

= Achillea collina =

Species of plant

Achillea collina is a species of perennial herb in the family Asteraceae.

The plants have simple, broad leaves and can grow up to 52 centimetres (20 in) tall.
