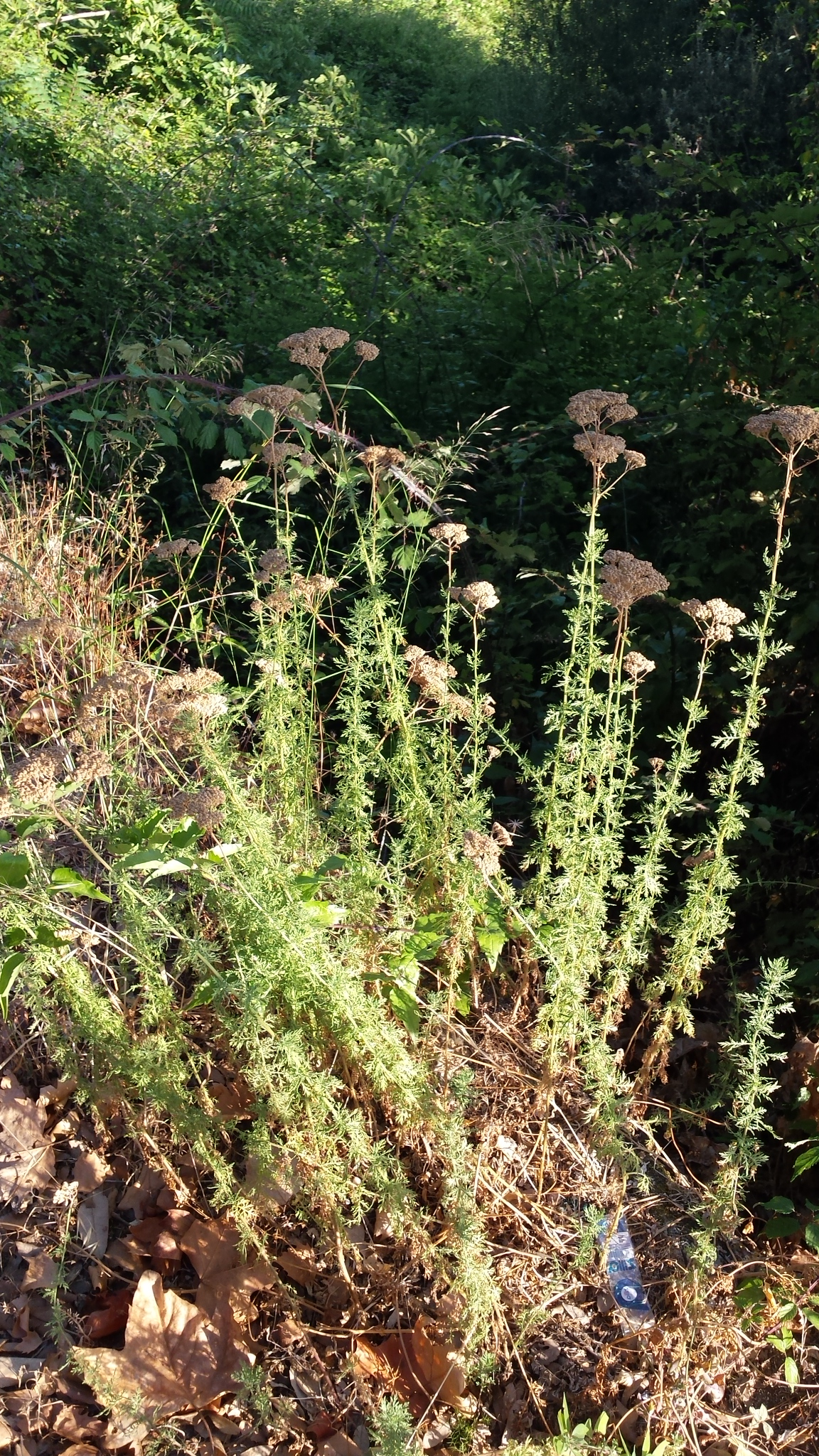

Scientific classification
- Kingdom: Plantae
- Clade: Tracheophytes
- Clade: Angiosperms
- Clade: Eudicots
- Clade: Asterids
- Order: Asterales
- Family: Asteraceae
- Genus: Achillea
- Species: A. ligustica

Binomial name
- Achillea ligustica All. 1773 not Vis. ex Nyman 1879

Synonyms
- Achillea sicula Raf.; Achillea sylvatica Ten.

= Achillea ligustica =

Species of yarrow

Achillea ligustica, the southern yarrow or Ligurian yarrow, is a flowering plant in the sunflower family. It is native to southern Europe (Italy, Spain, France, Greece, and the western Balkans) and sparingly naturalized in scattered locations in North America.
