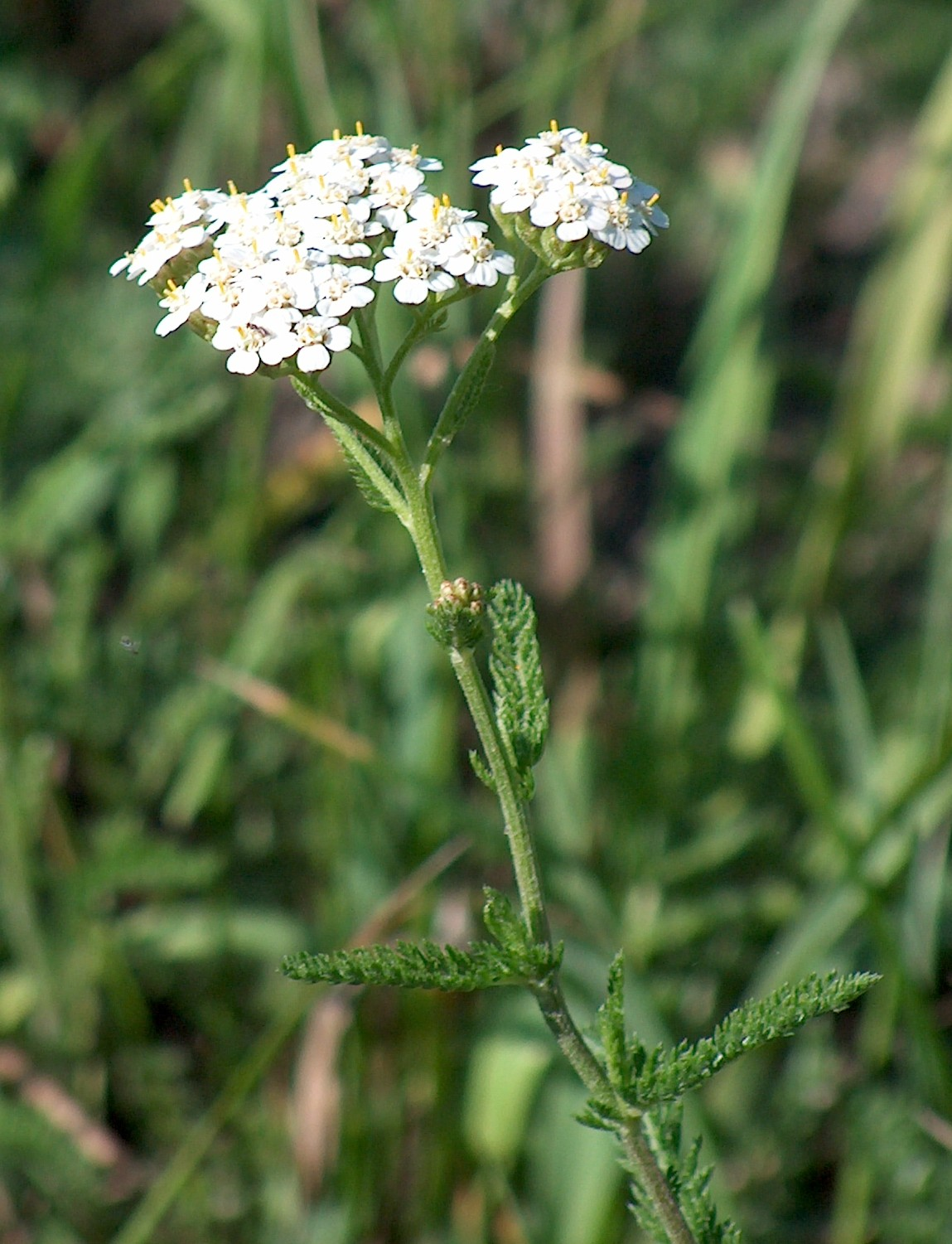
- Yarrow (Achillea millefolium)

Scientific classification
- Kingdom: Plantae
- Clade: Tracheophytes
- Clade: Angiosperms
- Clade: Eudicots
- Clade: Asterids
- Order: Asterales
- Family: Asteraceae
- Subfamily: Asteroideae
- Tribe: Anthemideae
- Genus: Achillea; L.

Type species
- Achillea millefolium L.

Synonyms
- Millefolium Mill.; Ptarmica Mill.

= Achillea =

Yarrow

Genus of flowering plants

Achillea /ækɪˈliːə/ is a genus of flowering plants in the family Asteraceae. The plants typically have frilly leaves and are known colloquially as yarrows, although this common name usually refers to A. millefolium. The genus was named after the Greek mythological character Achilles, whose soldiers were said to have used yarrow to treat their wounds; this is reflected by common names such as allheal and bloodwort. The genus is native primarily to Eurasia and North America.

== Description ==
These plants typically have frilly, hairy, aromatic leaves. The plants show large, flat clusters of small flowers at the top of the stem. The flowers can be white, yellow, orange, pink or red and are generally visited by many insects, and are thus characterised by a generalised pollination system.

== Taxonomy ==
Carl Linnaeus described the genus in 1753. The common name "yarrow" is usually applied to Achillea millefolium, but may also be used for other species within the genus.

=== Selected species ===
Nearly 1,000 names have been published within the genus Achillea, at or below the level of species. Sources differ widely as to which should be recognized as species, which merit subspecies or variety status, and which are merely synonyms of better-established names. For convenience, the Plant List maintained by the Kew Botanic Gardens is followed.

- Achillea abrotanoides
- Achillea absinthoides
- Achillea acuminata
- Achillea aegyptiaca – Egyptian yarrow
- Achillea ageratifolia – Balkan yarrow, Greek yarrow
- Achillea ageratum – sweet yarrow, sweet Nancy, English mace
- Achillea × albinea
- Achillea aleppica
- Achillea alexandri-regis
- Achillea alpina – Chinese yarrow, Siberian yarrow
- Achillea ambrosiaca
- Achillea apiculata
- Achillea arabica
- Achillea armenorum
- Achillea asiatica
- Achillea asplenifolia
- Achillea atrata – black yarrow
- Achillea aucheri
- Achillea auriculata
- Achillea baikalensis
- Achillea barbeyana
- Achillea barrelieri
- Achillea biserrata
- Achillea boissieri
- Achillea brachyphylla
- Achillea bucharica
- Achillea callichroa
- Achillea cappadocica
- Achillea carpatica
- Achillea chamaecyparissus
- Achillea chamaemelifolia
- Achillea cheilanthifolia
- Achillea chrysocoma
- Achillea clavennae – silvery yarrow
- Achillea clusiana
- Achillea clypeolata
- Achillea coarctata
- Achillea collina
- Achillea condensata
- Achillea conferta
- Achillea cretica
- Achillea crithmifolia
- Achillea cucullata
- Achillea cuneatiloba
- Achillea decolorans
- Achillea decumbens
- Achillea distans – Alps yarrow
- Achillea erba-rotta – musk milfoil
- Achillea eriophora
- Achillea euxina
- Achillea falcata
- Achillea filipendulina – fernleaf yarrow
- Achillea formosa
- Achillea fraasii – filigree yarrow
- Achillea fragantissima
- Achillea glaberrima
- Achillea goniocephala
- Achillea × graja
- Achillea grandifolia
- Achillea gypsicola
- Achillea haussknechtii
- Achillea heterophylla
- Achillea holosericea
- Achillea horanszkyi
- Achillea huber-morathii
- Achillea × illiczevski
- Achillea impatiens
- Achillea incognita
- Achillea inundata
- Achillea japonica
- Achillea karatavica
- Achillea kellalensis
- Achillea ketenoglui
- Achillea kotschyi
- Achillea laggeri
- Achillea latiloba
- Achillea ledebourii
- Achillea leptophylla
- Achillea leptophylloides
- Achillea lereschei
- Achillea ligustica – Ligurian yarrow
- Achillea lingulata
- Achillea lycaonica
- Achillea macrocephala
- Achillea macrophylla – broad-leaved yarrow
- Achillea magna
- Achillea magnifica
- Achillea maritima
- Achillea maura
- Achillea membranacea
- Achillea micrantha
- Achillea micranthoides
- Achillea millefolium – common yarrow
- Achillea mollis
- Achillea monocephala
- Achillea multifida
- Achillea nana – dwarf alpine yarrow
- Achillea nigrescens
- Achillea nobilis – noble yarrow, creamy yarrow
- Achillea obscura
- Achillea occulta
- Achillea ochroleuca
- Achillea odorata
- Achillea oligocephala
- Achillea oxyloba
- Achillea oxyodonta
- Achillea pachycephala
- Achillea phrygia
- Achillea pindicola
- Achillea pratensis
- Achillea pseudoaleppica
- Achillea pseudopectinata
- Achillea ptarmica – sneezewort, sneezeweed, sneezewort yarrow
- Achillea ptarmicifolia
- Achillea ptarmicoides
- Achillea pyrenaica
- Achillea rhodoptarmica
- Achillea roseo-alba
- Achillea rupestris
- Achillea salicifolia
- Achillea santolinoides
- Achillea schischkinii
- Achillea schmakovii
- Achillea schneideri
- Achillea schugnanica
- Achillea sedelmeyeriana
- Achillea seidlii
- Achillea sergievskiana
- Achillea setacea
- Achillea sieheana
- Achillea sinensis
- Achillea sintenisii
- Achillea sipikorensis
- Achillea spinulifolia
- Achillea squarrosa
- Achillea stepposa
- Achillea styriaca
- Achillea × submicrantha
- Achillea × subtaurica
- Achillea talagonica
- Achillea taygetea
- Achillea tenuifolia
- Achillea teretifolia
- Achillea thracica
- Achillea tomentosa – woolly yarrow
- Achillea tuzsonii
- Achillea umbellata
- Achillea valesiaca
- Achillea vermicularis
- Achillea virescens
- Achillea wilsoniana – Wilson's yarrow

=== Cultivars ===
The following cultivars are recipients of the Royal Horticultural Society's Award of Garden Merit:

- Achillea ageratifolia
- Achillea 'Coronation Gold'
- Achillea 'Credo'
- Achillea filipendulina 'Cloth of Gold'
- Achillea filipendulina 'Gold Plate'
- Achillea 'Heidi'
- Achillea 'Hella Glashoff'
- Achillea 'Lachsschönheit' (Galaxy Series)
- Achillea × lewisii 'King Edward'
- Achillea 'Lucky Break'
- Achillea 'Martina'
- Achillea millefolium 'Lansdorferglut'
- Achillea 'Mondpagode'
- Achillea 'Moonshine'
- Achillea 'Summerwine'

=== Etymology ===
The genus was named after the Greek mythological character Achilles. According to legend, Achilles' soldiers used yarrow to treat their wounds, hence some of its common names such as allheal and bloodwort.

== Distribution and habitat ==
The genus is primarily native to Europe, temperate areas of Asia, and North America.

== Ecology ==
Achillea species are used as food plants by the larvae of some Lepidoptera species.

== Uses ==
Achillea species and cultivars are popular garden plants.

== Gallery ==
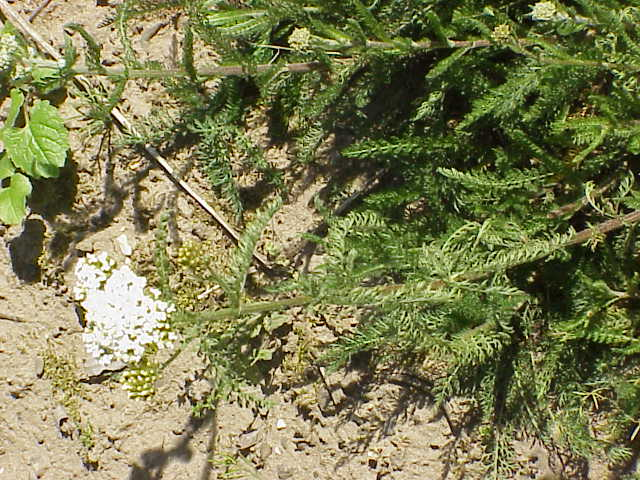
Achillea asplenifolia

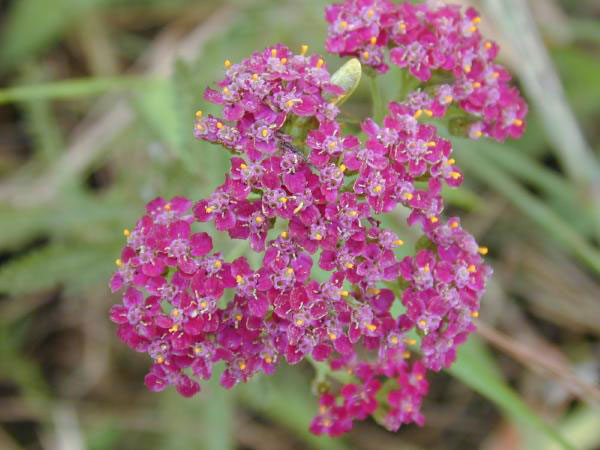
Yarrow (Achillea millefolium)

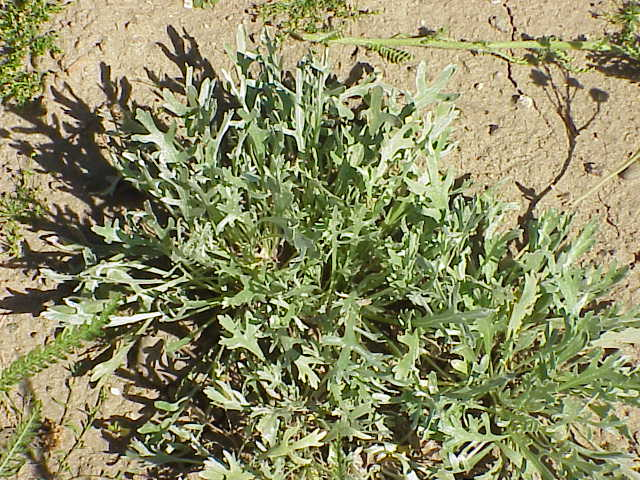
Silvery Yarrow (Achillea clavenae)

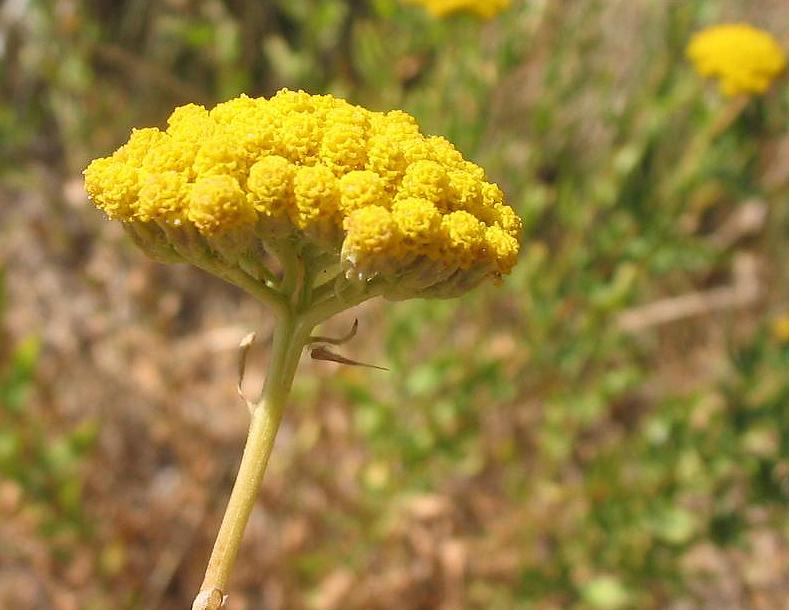
Sweet Yarrow (Achillea ageratum)

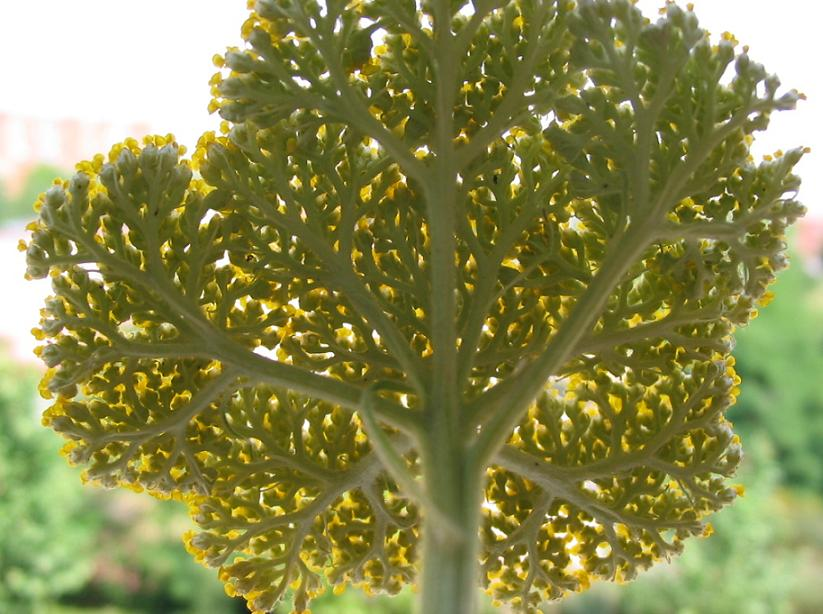
Fernleaf Yarrow (Achillea filipendula)

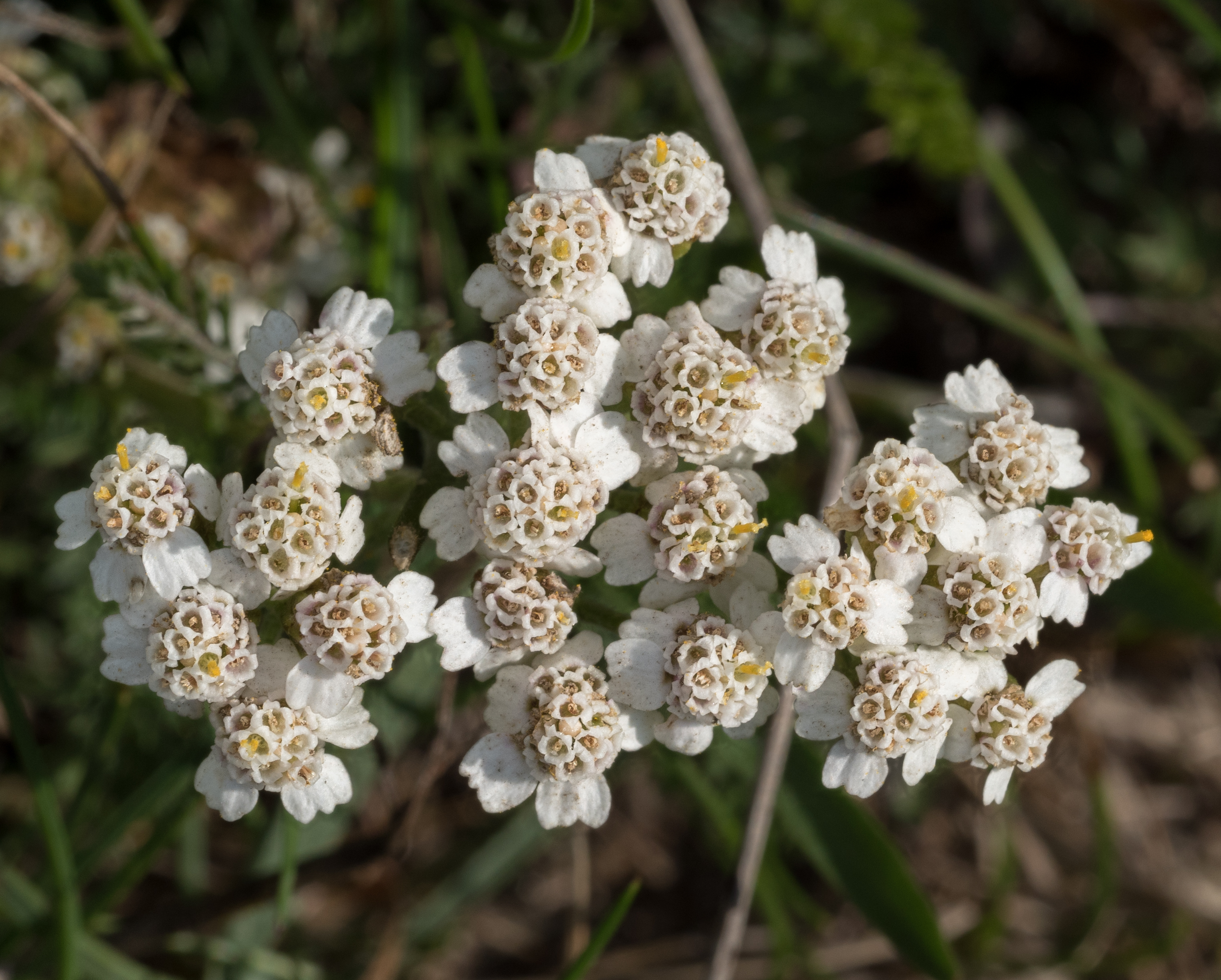
Macro image of Yarrow in Sweden

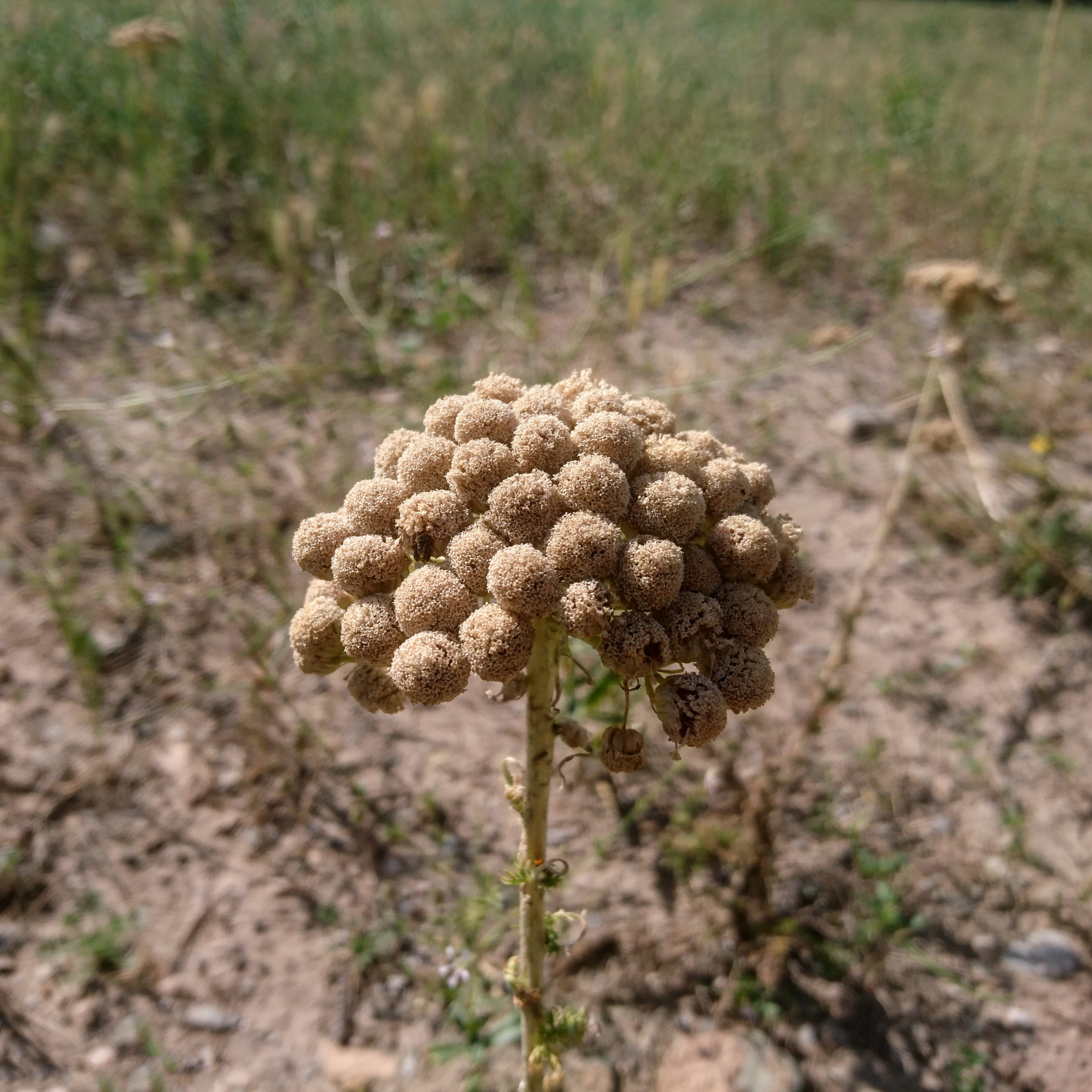
Yarrow inflorescence at seed maturity

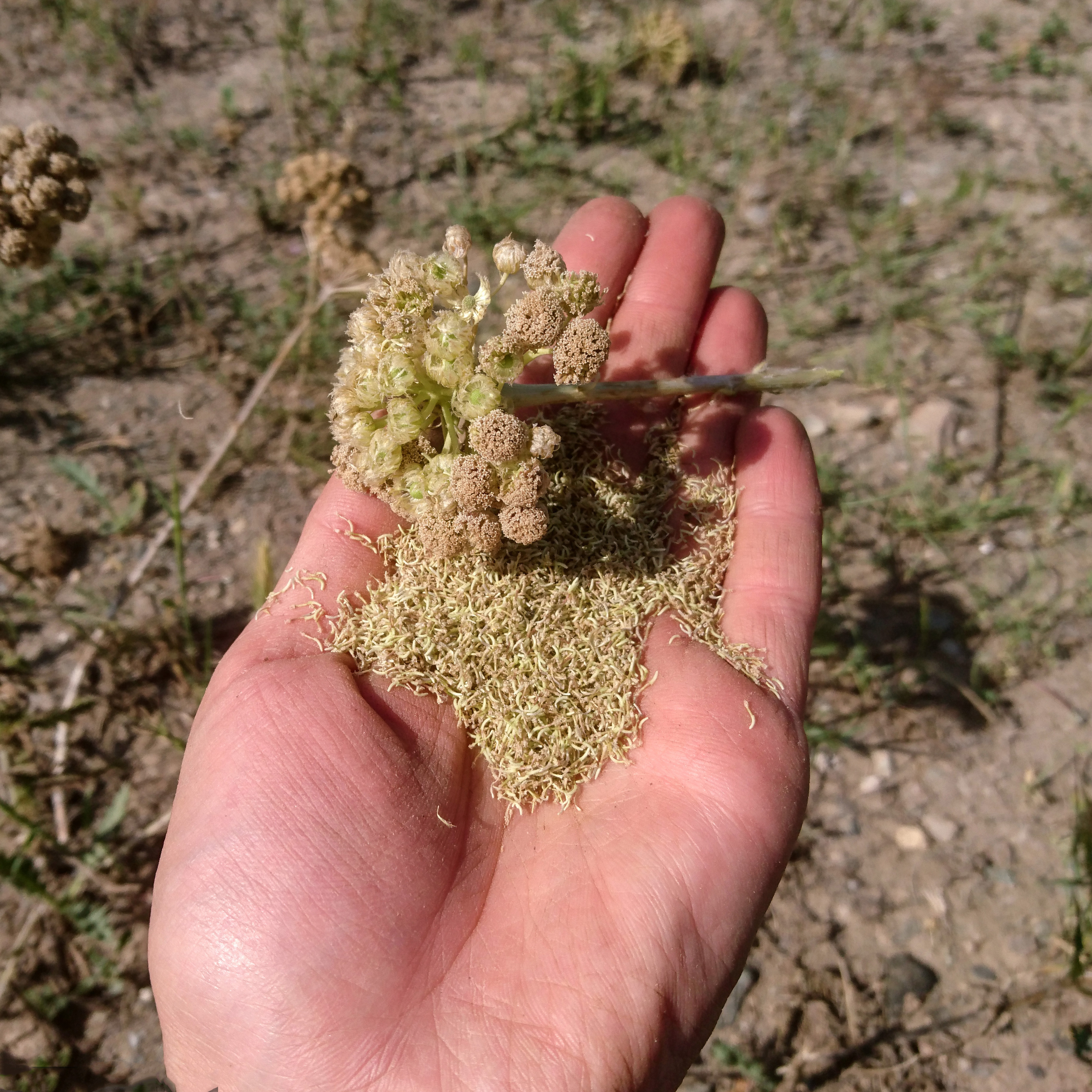
Yarrow inflorescence at seed maturity

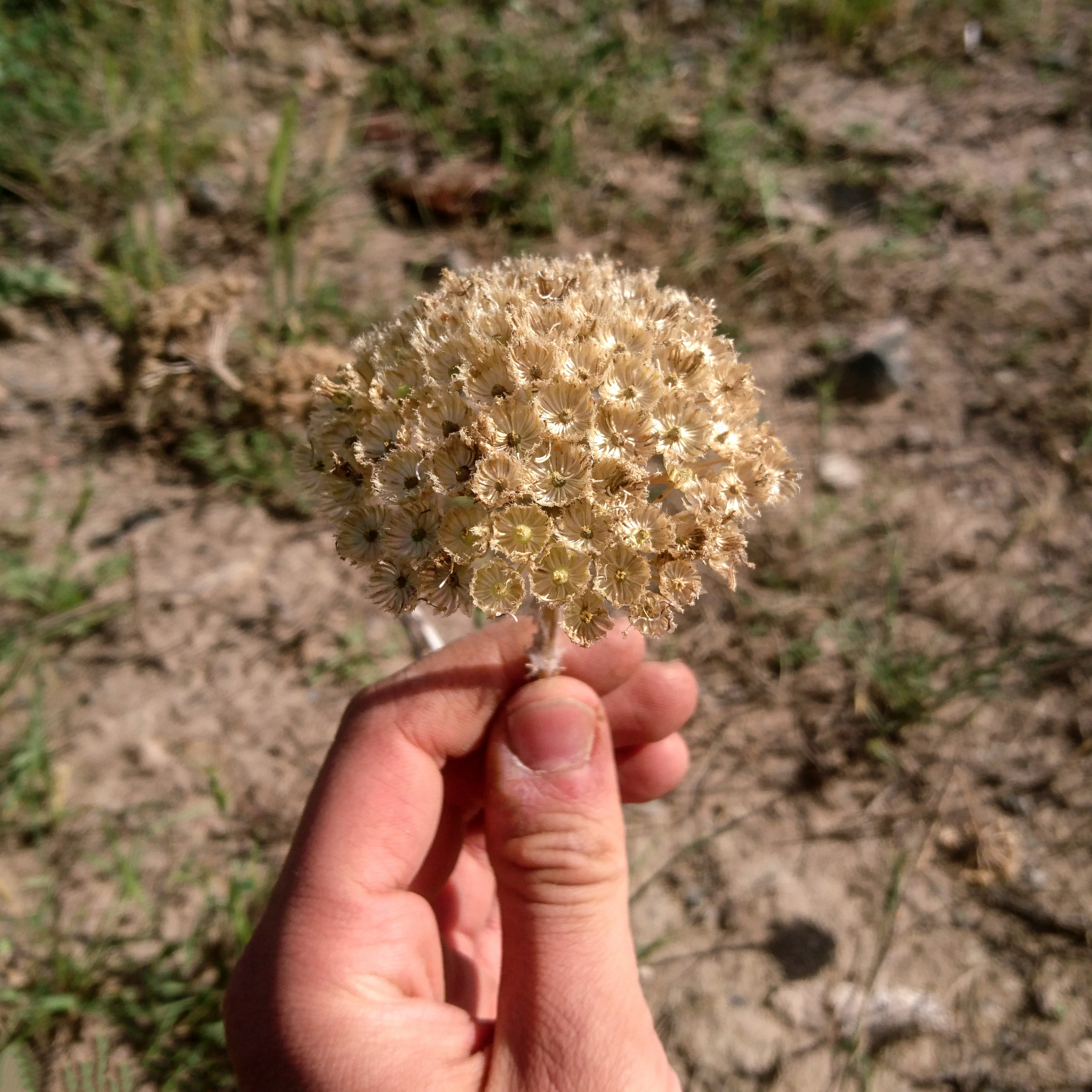
Yarrow inflorescence after seed fall

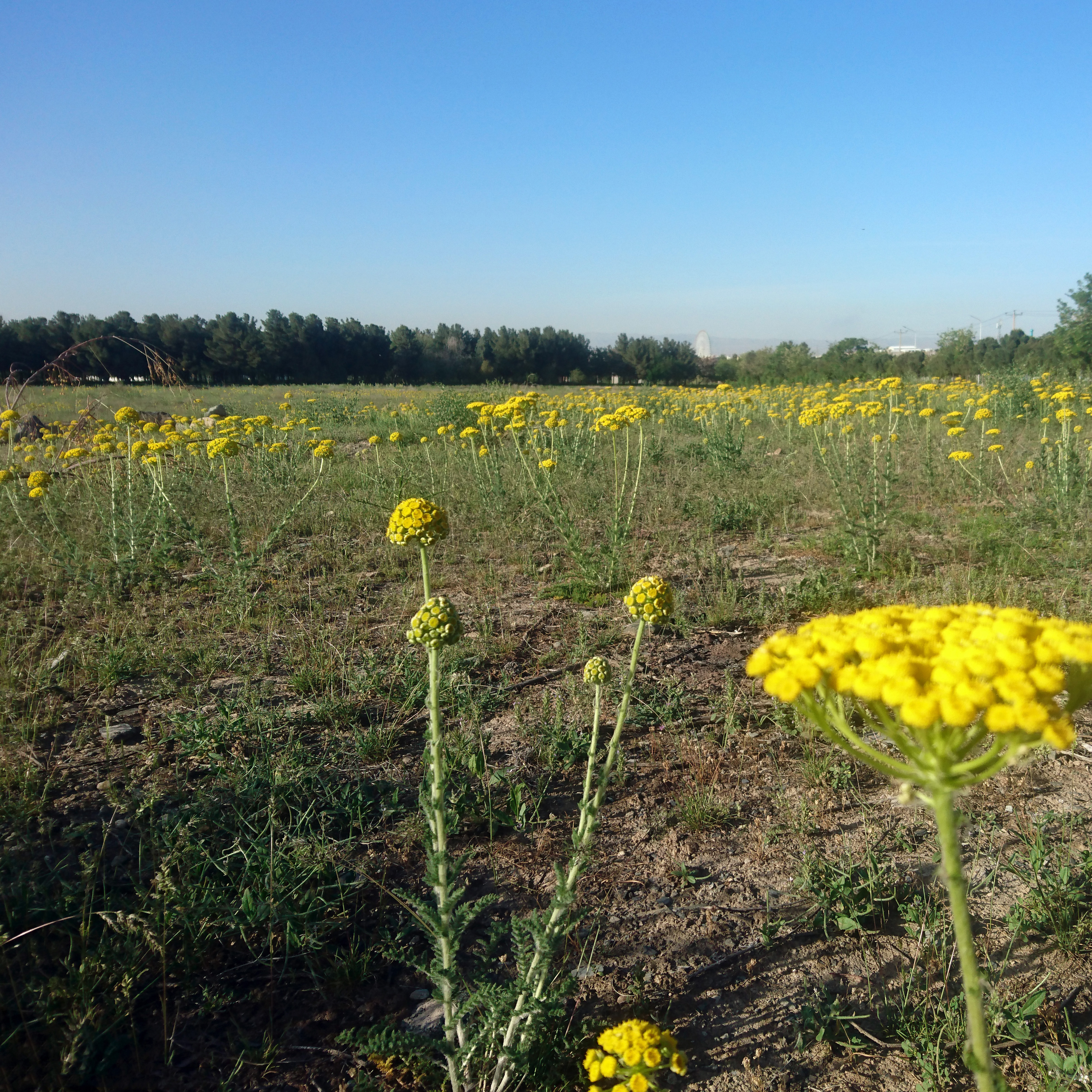
Natural growing of Achilleas
