= Brown-eyed Susan =

Brown-eyed Susan is a common name for several plants and may refer to:

- Rudbeckia hirta, flowering plant in the sunflower family, native North America and naturalized in China
- Rudbeckia triloba, native to the United States
