= Datura arenicola =

Scientific classification
- Kingdom: Plantae
- Clade: Tracheophytes
- Clade: Angiosperms
- Clade: Eudicots
- Clade: Asterids
- Order: Solanales
- Family: Solanaceae
- Genus: Datura
- Species: D. arenicola

Binomial name
- Datura arenicola Gentry ex Bye & Luna

Species of flowering plant

Datura arenicola is a species of flowering plant in the nightshade family Solanaceae.
