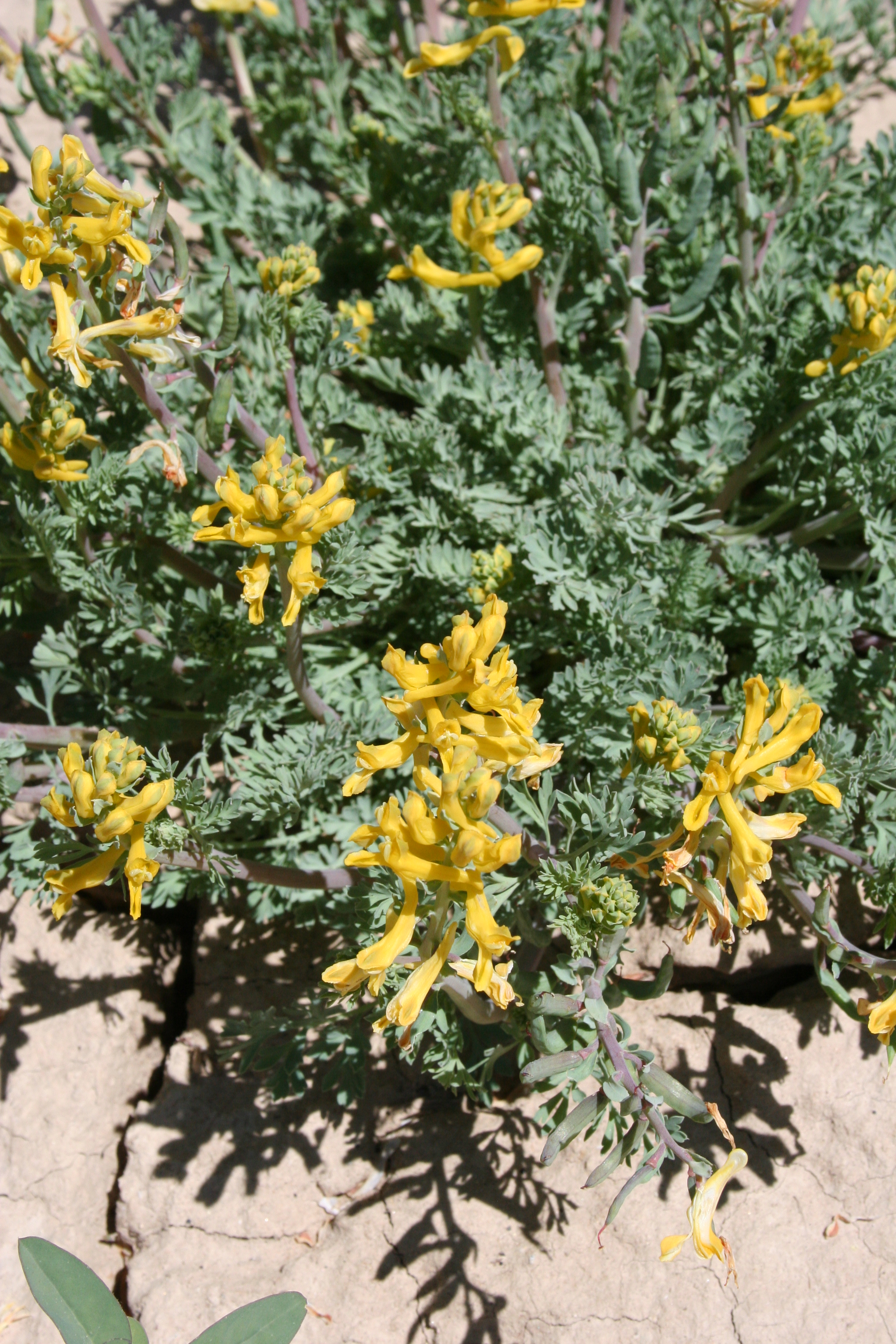

Scientific classification
- Kingdom: Plantae
- Clade: Tracheophytes
- Clade: Angiosperms
- Clade: Eudicots
- Order: Ranunculales
- Family: Papaveraceae
- Genus: Corydalis
- Species: C. aurea

Binomial name
- Corydalis aurea Willd.

Synonyms
- Capnoides aureum (Willd.) Kuntze; Corydalis washingtoniana Fedde

= Corydalis aurea =

Species of plant

Corydalis aurea, also known as scrambled eggs, golden smoke, or golden corydalis, is a flowering plant in the poppy family (Papaveraceae). The plant has a broad range stretching across North America and is able to thrive within a variety of ecosystems. The plant possesses numerous distinct characteristics. Its fruit most closely resembles that of a pea pod and is typically around 3/4 of an inch in length. The plant has numerous medicinal uses, as well as uses for gardens.

== Description ==
=== Flowers ===
The flowers are bilaterally symmetrical, yellow, 1 cm (0.39 in) long, with a pouch-like spur at the bottom of the petals that is around 0.5 cm (0.20 in) long and born in racemes of up to 30 flowers, each on a short stem. The flowers have four petals and six stamens, which classifies this flower under the Eudicots clade, also known as a monophyletic group. They are pollinated by insects. The flowers are originally erect but droop as they age. They flowers possess a green spot within the end of the tip's center that changes color as the flower reaches a later age. The flowers possess Indeterminate growth phenology and die when unable to handle environmental conditions. Their blooming season ranges from mid-winter to early fall, depending on their location and habitat.

=== Seeds ===
The seeds produced are not appetizing to taste and have been known to poison cattle and other animals due to the potentially toxic alkaloids they possess. Although potentially toxic, they have been utilized throughout history for medical uses for humans. The seeds disperse in two main manners, with those being through wind dispersion and through animal dispersion by ants.

=== Fruit ===
The fruits are cylindrical capsules. They most closely represent a pea pod shape and are typically a straight shape before curling in an upwards manner as its seeds prepare to disperse.

=== Stems and Leaves ===
Stems are decumbent, to 40 cm long, with blue-green or green-grey leaves divided into leaflets with oval or diamond lobes. Because of their pointed nature, the leaves have an appearance that is most comparable to a feather.

=== Roots ===
The root is a branching caudex. The roots possess medicinal properties, having been used to treat headaches.

== Uses ==
=== Medicinal ===
Traditionally used by Amerindians, its use as a tea provided relief for heart diseases, backaches, stomach aches, menstruation pain, diarrhea, sore throats, and bronchitis, among other things. The smoke and fumes produced from burning the plants' roots were used to relieve pain caused by headaches.

=== Aesthetic and Ornamental Uses ===
Uncommonly used for artificial habitats such as a rock garden.

== Range ==
Native to North America, Corydalis aurea ranges from western Quebec to California and can also be found in states such as Missouri, Texas, West Virginia, and along the New England states. A winter annual, it can be found in areas such as the sagebrush steppe but thrives in a variety of habitats such as mountain meadows, prairies, and in well wooded areas. They can be found along the bottom of creek beds underneath shade and surrounded by thickets along gravel grades.
