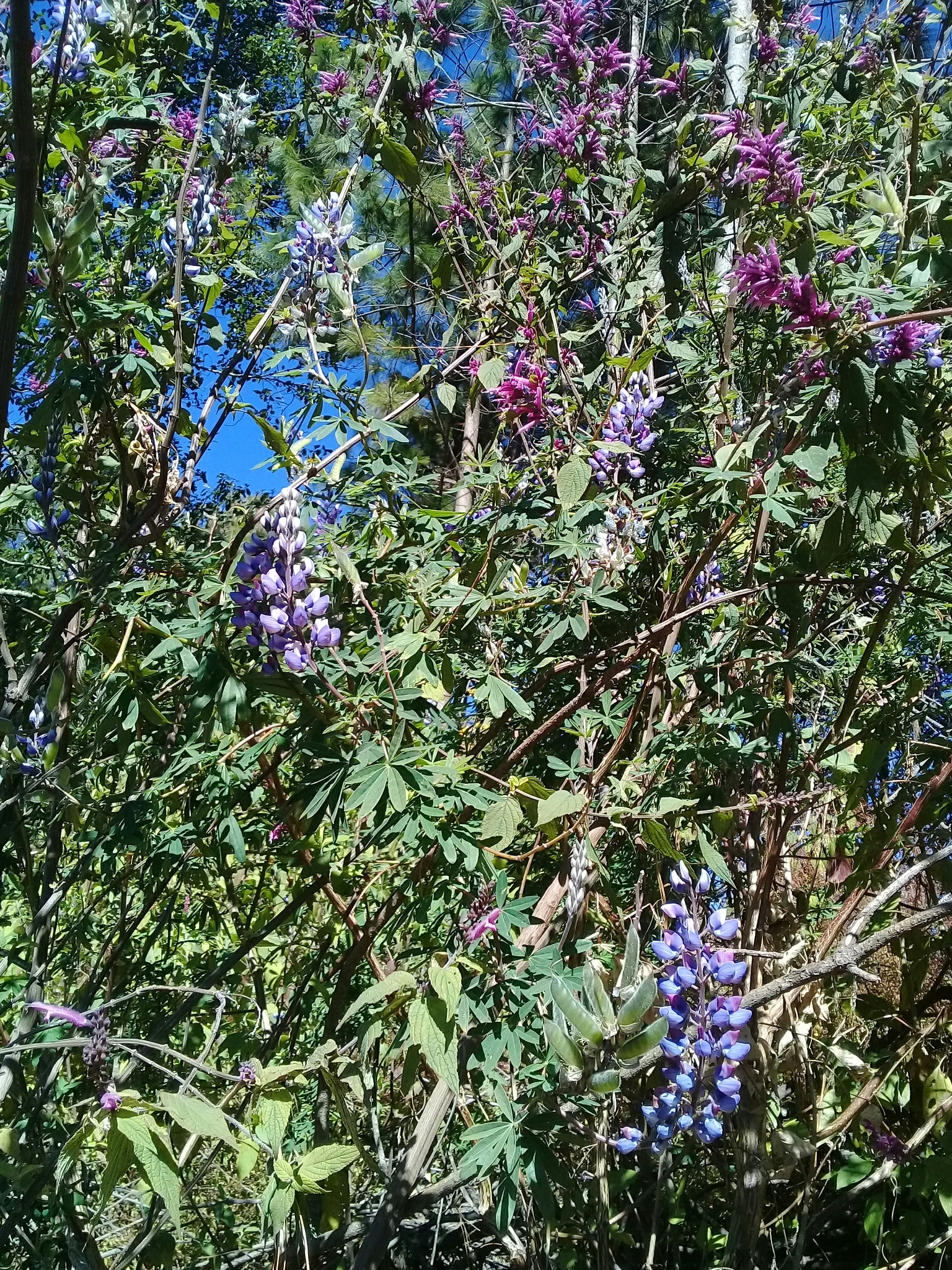

Scientific classification
- Kingdom: Plantae
- Clade: Embryophytes
- Clade: Tracheophytes
- Clade: Spermatophytes
- Clade: Angiosperms
- Clade: Eudicots
- Clade: Rosids
- Order: Fabales
- Family: Fabaceae
- Subfamily: Faboideae
- Genus: Lupinus
- Species: L. elegans

Binomial name
- Lupinus elegans Kunth

= Lupinus elegans =

Species of legume

Lupinus elegans is a species of flowering plant in the legume family known by the common names elegant lupine and Mexican lupine. It is native to Mexico and Guatemala.

== Description ==
This plant has a branching stem and grows up to 4 feet tall and 3 feet wide.

== Uses ==
This plant is commonly used for habitat restoration in its native range. It is planted in degraded coniferous forest, landscapes altered by volcanic activity, and land disturbed by agriculture. It is well adapted to several different ecosystems.
