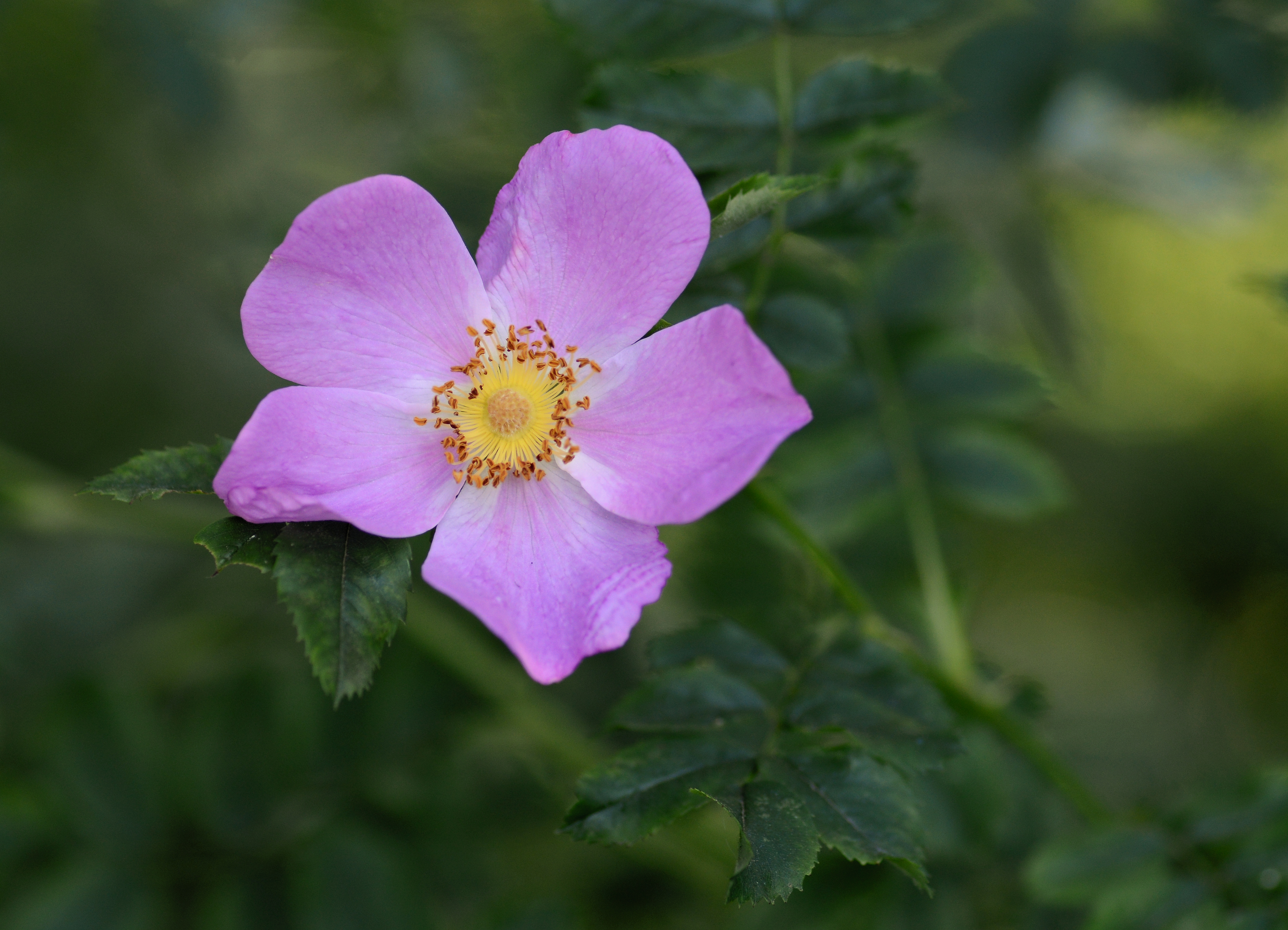

Conservation status
- Secure (NatureServe)

Scientific classification
- Kingdom: Plantae
- Clade: Embryophytes
- Clade: Tracheophytes
- Clade: Angiosperms
- Clade: Eudicots
- Clade: Rosids
- Order: Rosales
- Family: Rosaceae
- Genus: Rosa
- Species: R. virginiana

Binomial name
- Rosa virginiana Mill.

= Rosa virginiana =

Virginia rose

Species of shrub

Rosa virginiana, commonly known as the Virginia rose, common wild rose or prairie rose, is a woody perennial in the rose family native to eastern North America, where it is the most common wild rose. It is deciduous, forming a suckering shrub up to 2 metres in height, though often less. The stems are covered in numerous hooked prickles. The leaves are pinnate, usually with between 7 and 9 glossy leaflets. The pink flowers are borne singly or in small clusters and appear over a long period in midsummer. The fruits are small, round and bright red, rich in vitamin C and edible, being both used to make jams and tea. It grows in clearings, thickets, and shores. The plant attracts birds, bees, butterflies, and hummingbirds.

Charles and Bridget Quest-Ritson describe R. virginiana as "the best all-rounder among the wild roses", and draw attention to its leaf coloration in the fall: "the whole plant turns yellow, orange, scarlet, crimson and brown for weeks on end".

In cultivation, this plant has gained the Royal Horticultural Society's Award of Garden Merit.
