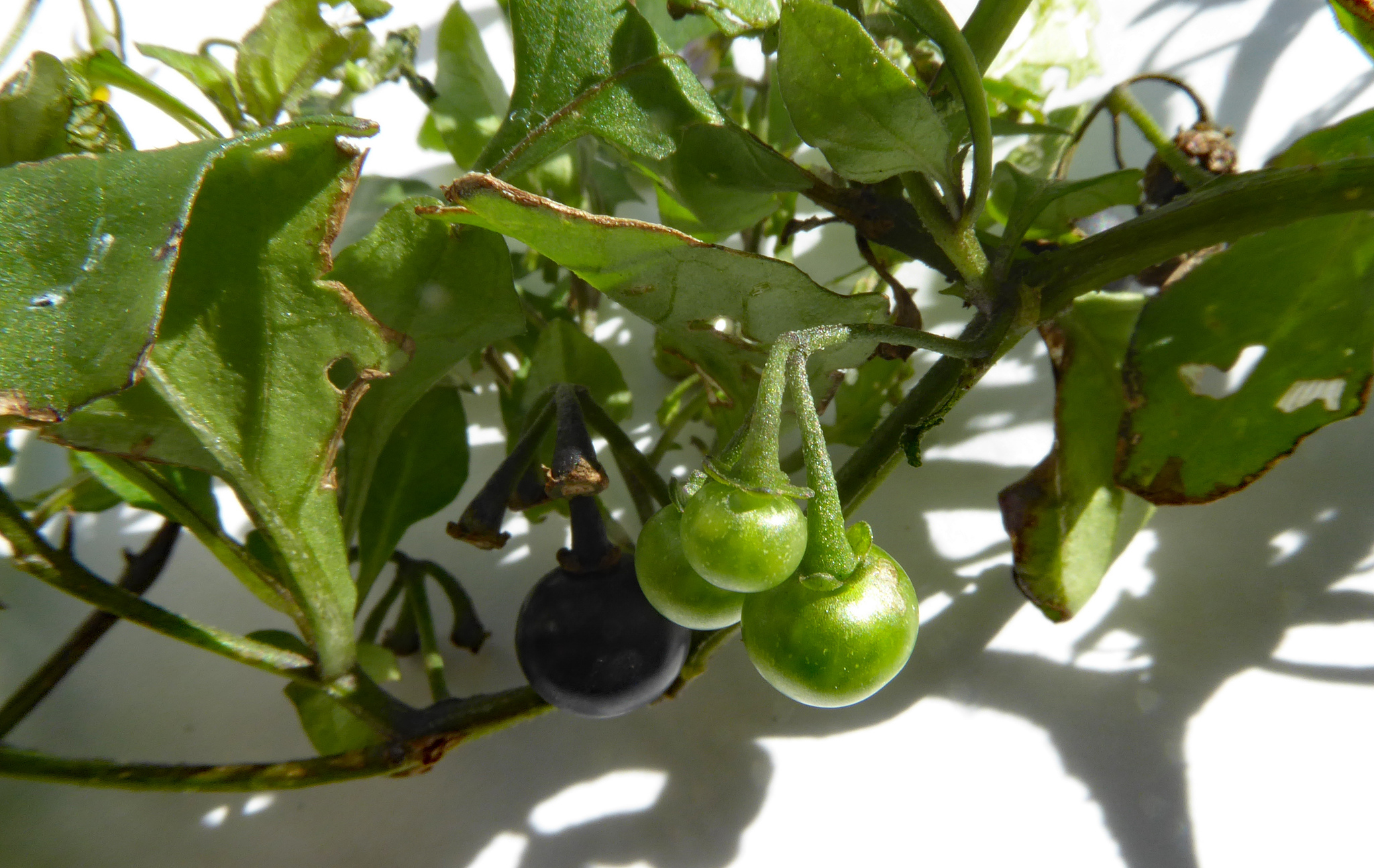

Scientific classification
- Kingdom: Plantae
- Clade: Tracheophytes
- Clade: Angiosperms
- Clade: Eudicots
- Clade: Asterids
- Order: Solanales
- Family: Solanaceae
- Genus: Solanum
- Species: S. opacum

Binomial name
- Solanum opacum A.Braun & C.D.Bouché

Synonyms
- Solanum allanii Polgar; Solanum apopsilomenum Bitter; Solanum brachypetalum Bitter; Solanum fauriei H.Lév.; Solanum forsteri Seem.; Solanum insulae-paschalis Bitter; Solanum microtatanthum Bitter; Solanum nigrum var. nihoense F.Br.; Solanum nigrum var. pitcairnense F.Br.; Solanum nodiflorum var. fauriei (H.Lév.) O.Deg. & I.Deg.

= Solanum opacum =

Species of plant in the nightshade family

Solanum opacum is a species of flowering plant in the family Solanaceae. It is referred to by the common names green berry nightshade, or morelle verte, and is a sprawling annual native to eastern Australia. It is part of the black nightshade group of Solanum species.

== Description ==
A sprawling annual herb, minutely hairy, and with no prickles. The leaves are ovate to lanceolate, 3–6 cm (1.2–2.4 in) long and 1–2 cm (0.4–0.8 in) wide, usually with shallowly lobed margins. Both leaf surfaces are green and sparsely hairy. The petiole is 1–4 cm (0.4–1.6 in) long. Inflorescences 2–5-flowered with a white stellate corolla 8–12 mm diameter. The berry is 8–10 mm diam., and green when mature.

== Plant chemistry ==
An unidentified alkaloidal aglycone (0.4%) has been detected in the fruits of S.opacum, but none in the leaves or stems.

== Food ==
Uncommonly cultivated as a "rare" fruit. The ripe berries are eaten when yellowish green, and the flavor is described as spicy-sweet.
