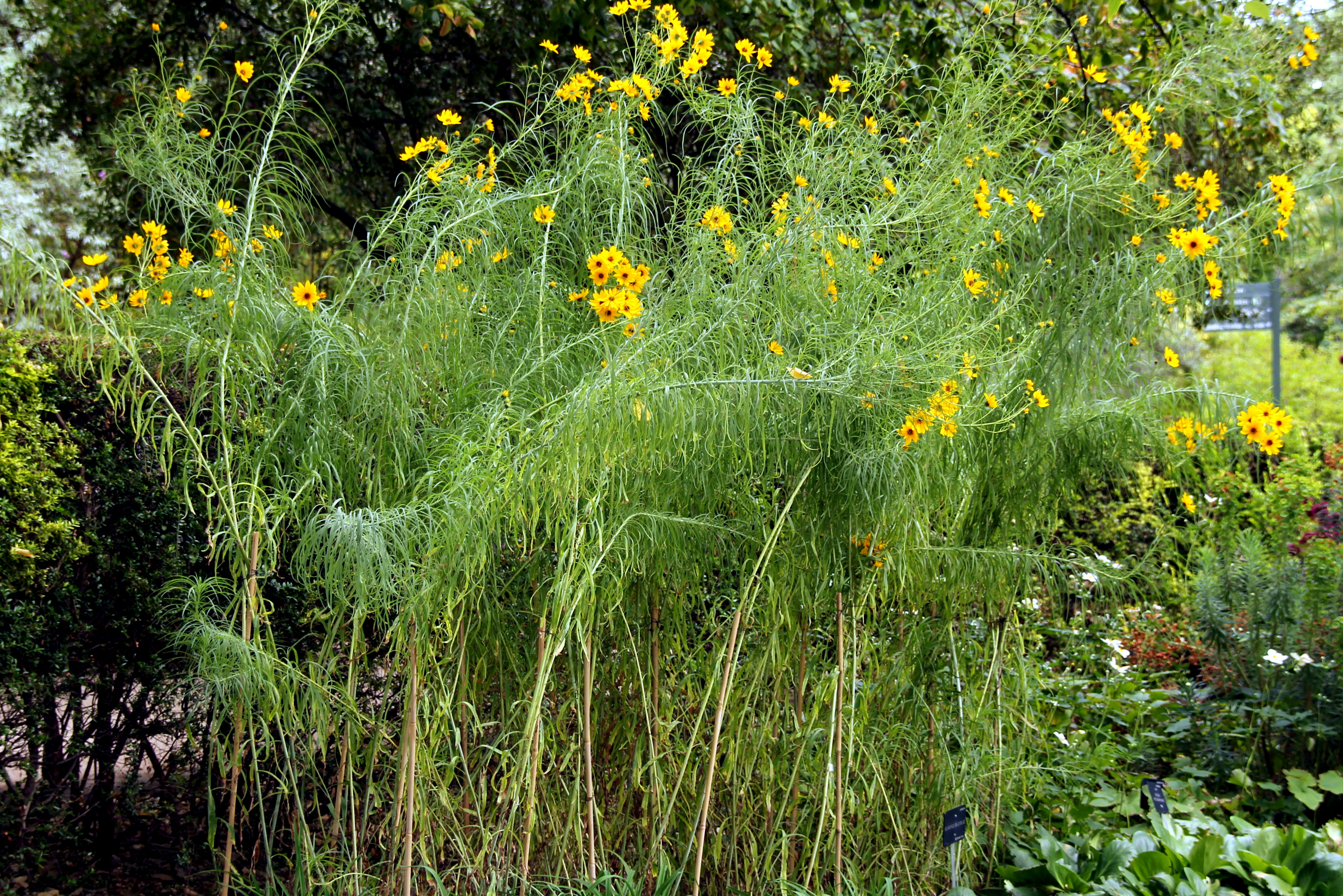

Conservation status
- Least Concern (IUCN 3.1)

Scientific classification
- Kingdom: Plantae
- Clade: Tracheophytes
- Clade: Angiosperms
- Clade: Eudicots
- Clade: Asterids
- Order: Asterales
- Family: Asteraceae
- Tribe: Heliantheae
- Genus: Helianthus
- Species: H. salicifolius

Binomial name
- Helianthus salicifolius A.Dietr.

Synonyms
- Helianthus filiformis Small; Helianthus orgyalis DC.

= Helianthus salicifolius =

Species of sunflower

Helianthus salicifolius is a North American species of sunflower known by the common name willowleaf sunflower. It is native to the central United States, primarily in the Great Plains and Ozark Plateau (states of Missouri, Kansas, Oklahoma, and Texas). There are a few reports of scattered populations in the Northeast and Midwest parts of the country, but these appear to be escapes from cultivation.

== Description ==
Helianthus salicifolius grows in limestone prairies. It is a perennial herbaceous plant up to 2.5 m (8.2 ft) tall, spreading by means of underground rhizomes. The leaves are long but very narrow, up to 21 cm (8.3 in) long, but rarely more than 1.2 cm (half an inch) wide. One plant usually produces 6-15 flower heads, each containing 10-20 yellow ray florets surrounding 50 or more red disc florets.

== Bioenergy production ==
H. salicifolius is resistant to drought, pests, and frost. According to research, the species can be used to generate biogas for energy production.
