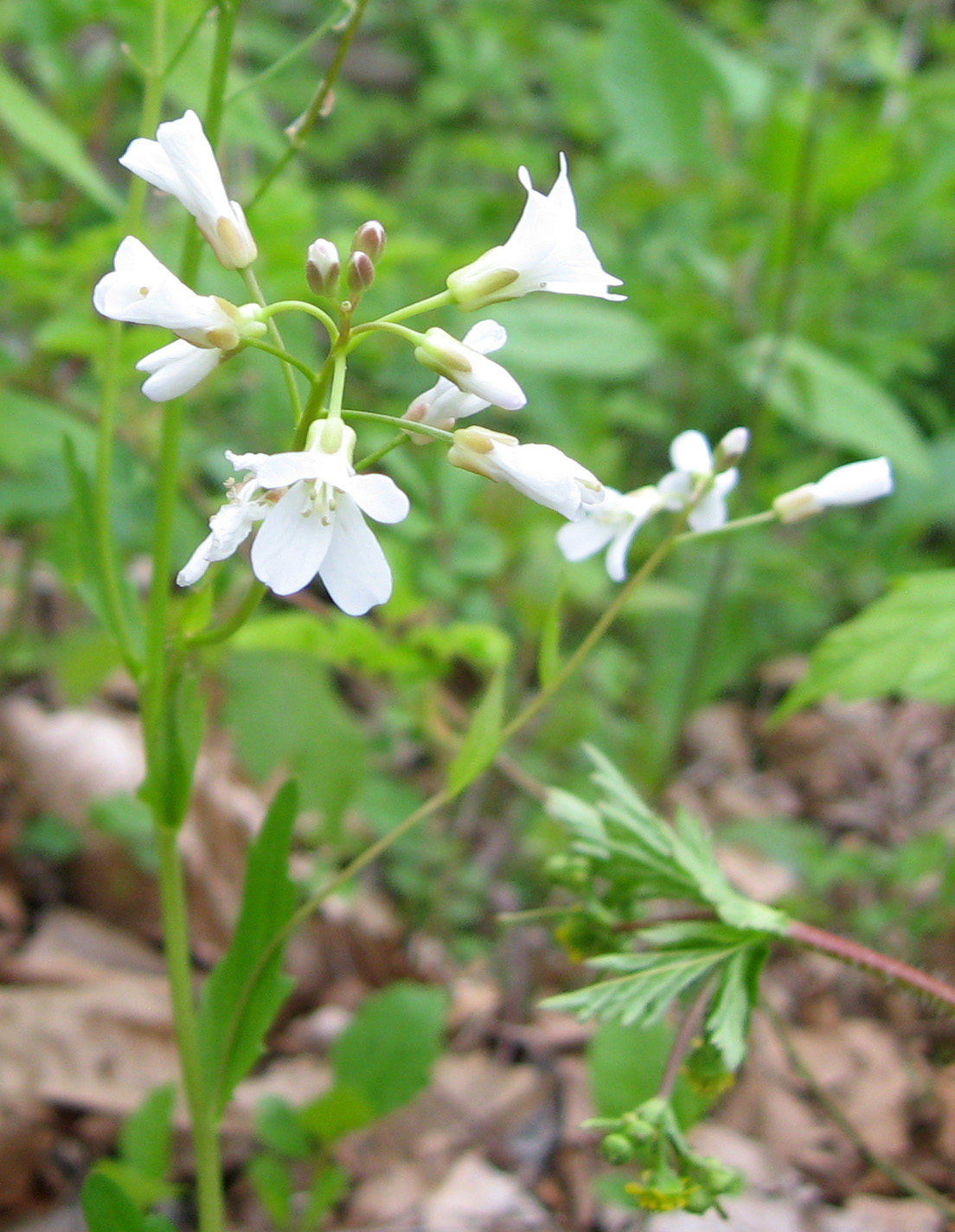

Conservation status
- Least Concern (IUCN 3.1)

- Secure (NatureServe)

Scientific classification
- Kingdom: Plantae
- Clade: Tracheophytes
- Clade: Angiosperms
- Clade: Eudicots
- Clade: Rosids
- Order: Brassicales
- Family: Brassicaceae
- Genus: Cardamine
- Species: C. bulbosa

Binomial name
- Cardamine bulbosa (Schreb. ex Muhl.) Britton, Sterns & Poggenb.
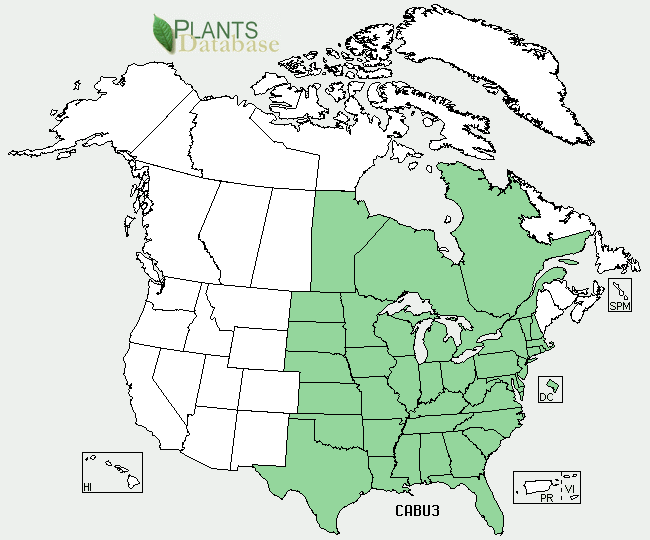
- Natural range in North America

Synonyms
- Arabis bulbosa Schreb. ex Muhl.; Arabis rhomboidea Pers.; Cardamine rhomboídea (Pers.) DC.; Dentaria rhomboidea (Pers.) Greene; Dracamine bulbosa (BSP) Nieuwl.

= Cardamine bulbosa =

Species of plant

Cardamine bulbosa, commonly called bulbous bittercress or spring cress, is a perennial plant in the mustard family. It is native to a widespread area of eastern North America, in both Canada and the United States. Its natural habitat is moist soils of bottomland forests and swamps, often in calcareous areas.

In late spring and early summer, white flowers are produced well above the foliage. Its leaves are edible, and have a peppery taste.
