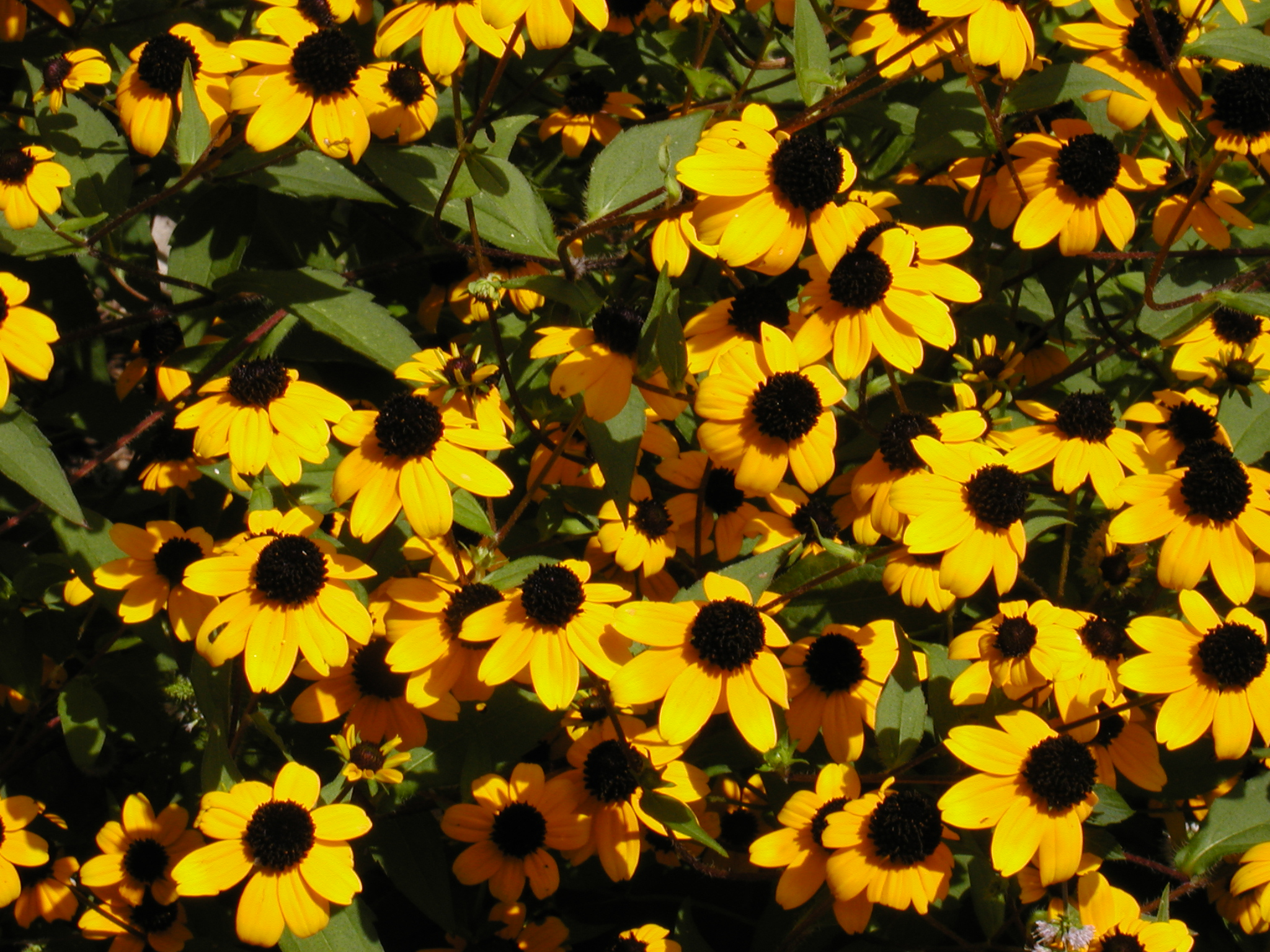

Conservation status
- Secure (NatureServe)

Scientific classification
- Kingdom: Plantae
- Clade: Tracheophytes
- Clade: Angiosperms
- Clade: Eudicots
- Clade: Asterids
- Order: Asterales
- Family: Asteraceae
- Tribe: Heliantheae
- Genus: Rudbeckia
- Species: R. triloba

Binomial name
- Rudbeckia triloba L.

= Rudbeckia triloba =

Species of flowering plant

Rudbeckia triloba, the browneyed or brown-eyed susan, thin-leaved coneflower or three-leaved coneflower, is a species of flowering plant in the family Asteraceae with numerous, yellow, daisy-like flowers. It is native to the central and eastern United States and is often seen in old fields or along roads. It is also cultivated as an ornamental.

== Description ==
Rudbeckia triloba is a biennial or short-lived perennial herbaceous plant that grows to a height of 5 ft (150 cm) with a spread of up to 2.5 ft (75 cm). The primary stem has numerous branches, giving the plant an open, bushy appearance. The stems and branches are hairy and medium green, sometimes with a reddish color. The leaves are also hairy. The basal leaves have three lobes (hence The Latin specific epithet triloba). The stem leaves are alternate and can vary in shape, from three-lobed, generally toward the bottom of the stem, to unlobed, higher up on the central stem and on the secondary branches. The three-lobed stem leaves are up to 7 in (18 cm) long and 4 in (10 cm) wide, and the unlobed leaves are up to 3 in (8 cm) long and 1 in (3 cm) wide.

One or two flower heads measuring 0.5–1.5 in (1–4 cm) appear at the end of individual upper stems. Each flower head has six to twelve bright yellow ray florets surrounding a purplish brown flattened cone of disk florets. The flower heads are abundant and showy, although they have little or no scent.

=== Similar species ===
Compared with Rudbeckia hirta, R. triloba is taller with smaller, more numerous flowers, and the leaves of R. hirta are unlobed with a fuzzy upper surface. Compared with Rudbeckia laciniata, R. triloba is shorter and has fewer lobed leaves.

== Distribution and habitat ==
R. triloba is native in the United States from Utah to the west, Texas and Florida to the south, Minnesota to the north, and Massachusetts to the east. Habitats include disturbed ground, woodland borders, thickets, rocky slopes, and alongside roads and railways.

== Uses ==
=== Cultivation ===
R. triloba is widely cultivated in gardens and is easy to grow when provided with full sun and moist soil. The plant should be deadheaded regularly to encourage additional bloom, prevent any unwanted self-seeding, or both.

In cultivation in the UK, Rudbeckia triloba has gained the Royal Horticultural Society's Award of Garden Merit.

== See also ==
- Rudbeckia hirta
