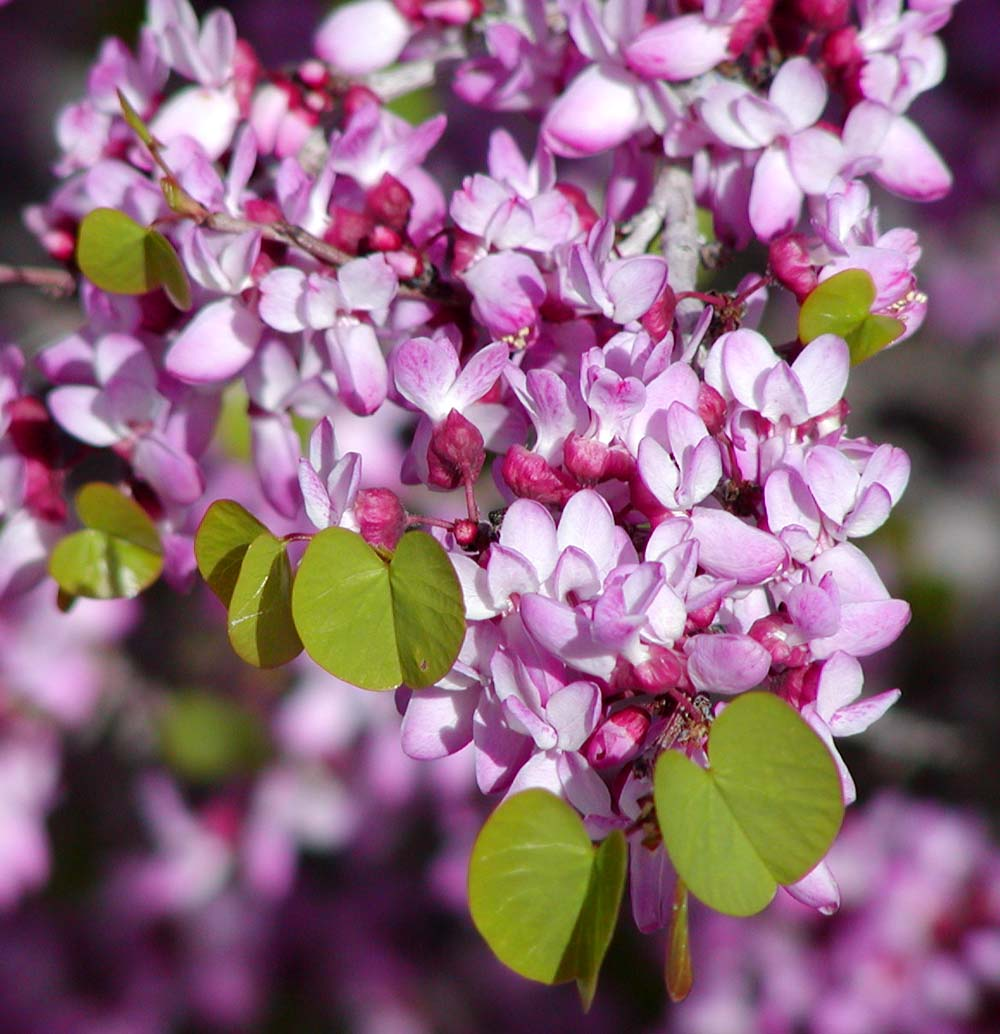

Scientific classification
- Kingdom: Plantae
- Clade: Tracheophytes
- Clade: Angiosperms
- Clade: Eudicots
- Clade: Rosids
- Order: Fabales
- Family: Fabaceae
- Genus: Cercis
- Species: C. occidentalis

Binomial name
- Cercis occidentalis Torr. ex Gray (1850)
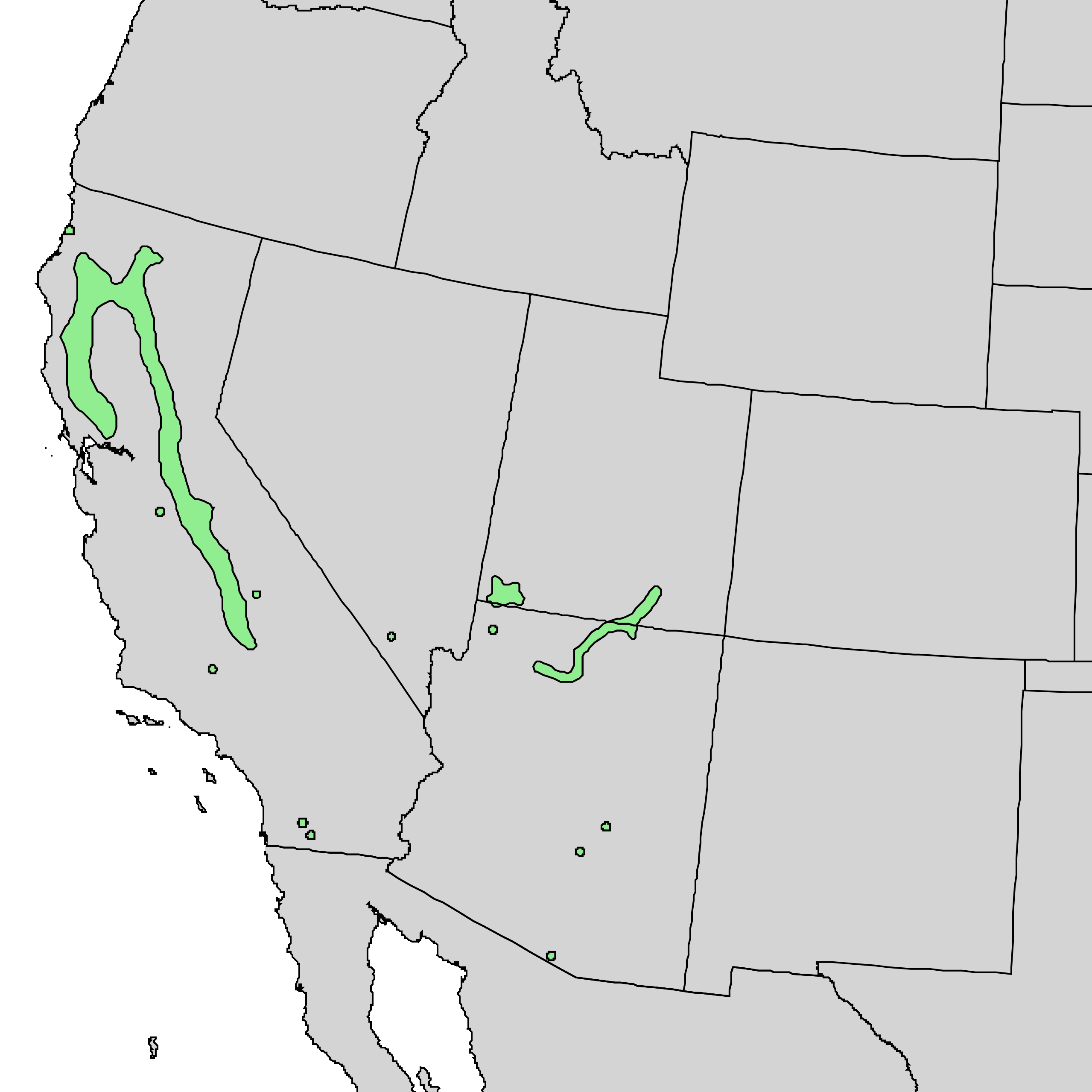
- Natural range of Cercis occidentalis

Synonyms
- Cercis californica Torr. ex Benth. (1857); Cercis latissima Greene (1912); Cercis nephrophylla Greene (1912); Siliquastrum occidentale (Torr. ex A.Gray) Greene (1894)

= Cercis occidentalis =

Western redbud

Species of tree

Cercis occidentalis, the western redbud or California redbud, is a small tree or shrub in the legume family, Fabaceae. It is found primarily in Oregon and Northern California, with other redbuds of Utah and Arizona typically being the related species Cercis orbiculata.

It is easily recognized when it is in bloom from March to May, when it is covered with small pink to purple flowers.

== Description ==
Cercis occidentalis is a deciduous shrub to small tree, growing up to 7 metres (23 ft) tall. The largest individual is in Santa Rosa and is 8.8 metres (29 ft) high. Its crown is rounded on clustered, erect branches to a width of 10–20 feet (3.0–6.1 m). The branches are thin, shiny, and brown. Twigs are slender, erect, and hairless.

The leaves are arranged alternately along the twigs and are simple, round, and slightly leathery, growing to 5–9 centimetres (2.0–3.5 in) in diameter, with 12–25-millimetre (0.47–0.98 in) petioles. They have heart shaped bases with entire margins. Leaves have 7 to 9 fan-like veins. The upper surfaces of the leaves are dark green, shiny, and hairless, while their lower surfaces are green and hairless. They start as light green early in the season and darken as they age; on plants at higher elevation, leaves may turn gold or red as the weather cools.

Inflorescences are unbranched and showy with bright pink or magenta flowers. Flowers, described as similar to pea flowers, measure about 12 millimetres (0.47 in) long and appear before leaves emerge. They grow in clusters all over the shrub, making the plant very colorful and noticeable in the landscape. The fruits are legume pods, 4–7.5 centimetres (1.6–3.0 in) long and about 12 millimetres (0.47 in) wide, thin and dry, and brown or reddish-purple. The clustered pods persist through winter.

It is an abundant seeder and seeds have a high rate of germination. It endures shade in early life and light shade when mature; shade tolerance appears to be greater with increased soil moisture.

The wood is fine-grained, dark yellowish brown, with a thin layer of whitish sapwood.

Compared to the more commonly cultivated Cercis canadensis, it has more rounded leaves and tends to grow as a small shrub rather than a tree, although it does commonly grow as larger trees up to 25 feet tall, particularly in natural settings.

== Habitat ==
Its native habitats include foothill woodlands and chaparrals; they grow near stream banks in dry foothills and lower canyon slopes below 1,100 metres (3,600 ft). It grows frequently in crevices and pockets where seeds are well covered with mineral soil.

== Ecology ==
Cercis occidentalis flowers bloom in spring from February to April. As is the case with other legumes, it is a nitrogen-fixing plant because of the presence of root nodules, allowing symbiotic bacteria to produce nitrogen. They grow singly and in shrubby clumps alongside California buckeye, ceanothus, manzanita, and other chaparral brush.

It is noted for attracting birds and other wildlife. The leaves are harvested by native leafcutter bees and the flowers are an important nectar and pollen source for native insects and hummingbirds.

It can be susceptible to occasional tent caterpillar infestations, but these can be controlled. It is also known to be susceptible to other caterpillars as well as crown rot, phytophthora, root rot, and scales. It is resistant to oak root fungus and armillaria.

== Uses ==
Indigenous Californians use the twigs of the western redbud to weave baskets, and even prune the shrub to encourage growth of new twigs.

It has been described as being worthy of notice for foresters only because of their use in "forming a scanty cover along dry, rocky borders of streams," and the wood has been described as being of no economic or domestic use.

=== Cultivation ===
Cercis occidentalis is cultivated as an ornamental plant and tree, for planting in parks and gardens, and as a street tree. It is also used in drought tolerant, native plant, and wildlife gardens. It is also used as a screen tree.

== Cultural significance ==
Cercis occidentalis is important to the ethnobotany of multiple native groups, being used in basketry, and has different names in their respective languages. Botanist Victor King Chestnut gave the name for the tree in various north California indigenous languages; according to him, the Yuki call the tree Chā'ā, the Koncow call it dop or tal'k, the Ukiah (cited as Yokia) call it Kälā' ä kälã', and it is called Mūlā' in Northern Pomo.

== Images ==
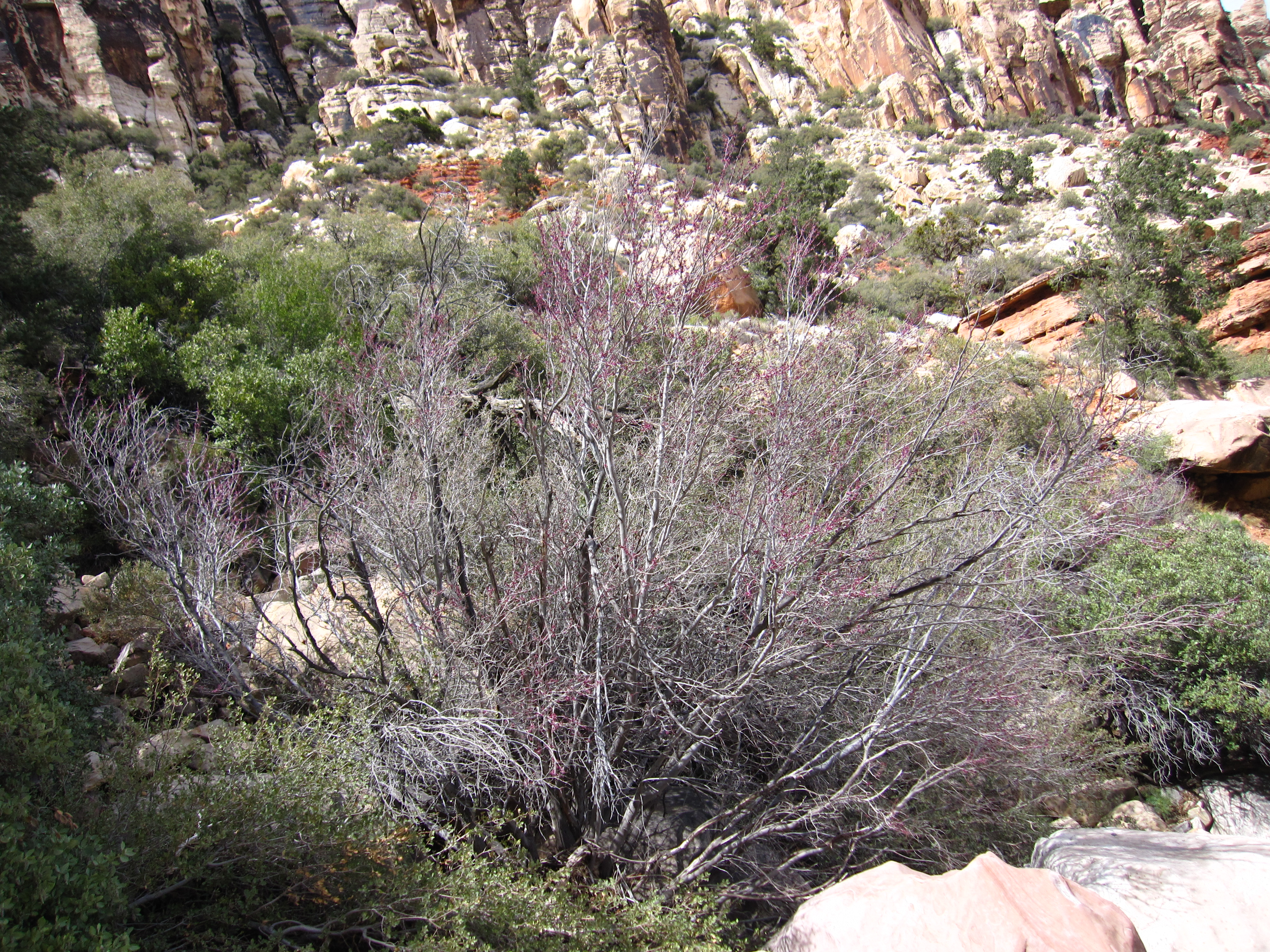
Redbud during spring, March 2012

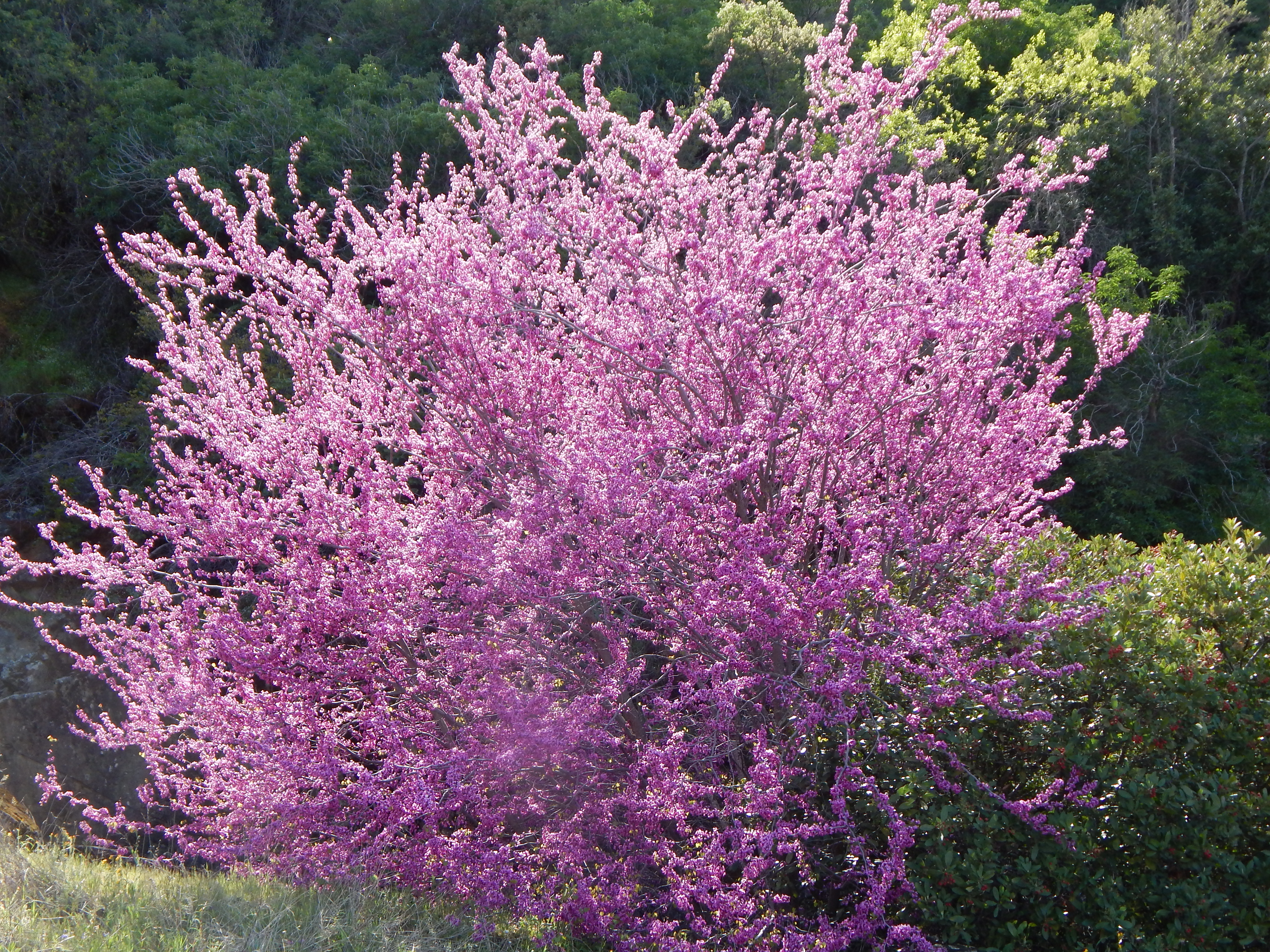
Western redbud near Briceburg, California April 2019

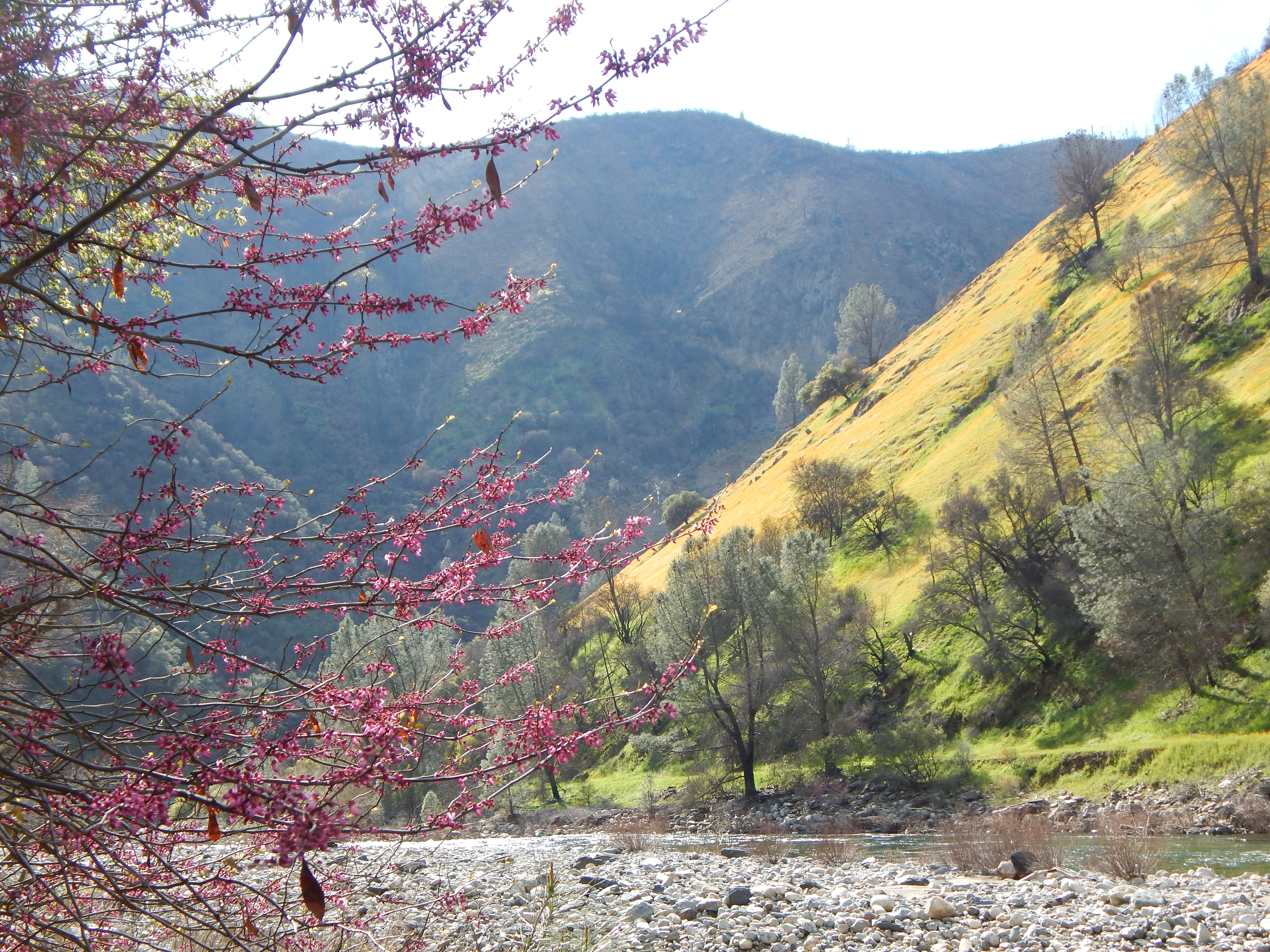
Redbud, poppies and much more − Merced River canyon March 2019

== Bibliography ==
- Casebeer, M. (2004). Discover California Shrubs. Sonora, California: Hooker Press. ISBN 0-9665463-1-8
- Chestnut, Victor King (1902). Plants Used by the Indians of Mendocino County, California. Contributions from the U.S. National Herbarium. Vol. VII. Washington, D.C.: Government Printing Office.
