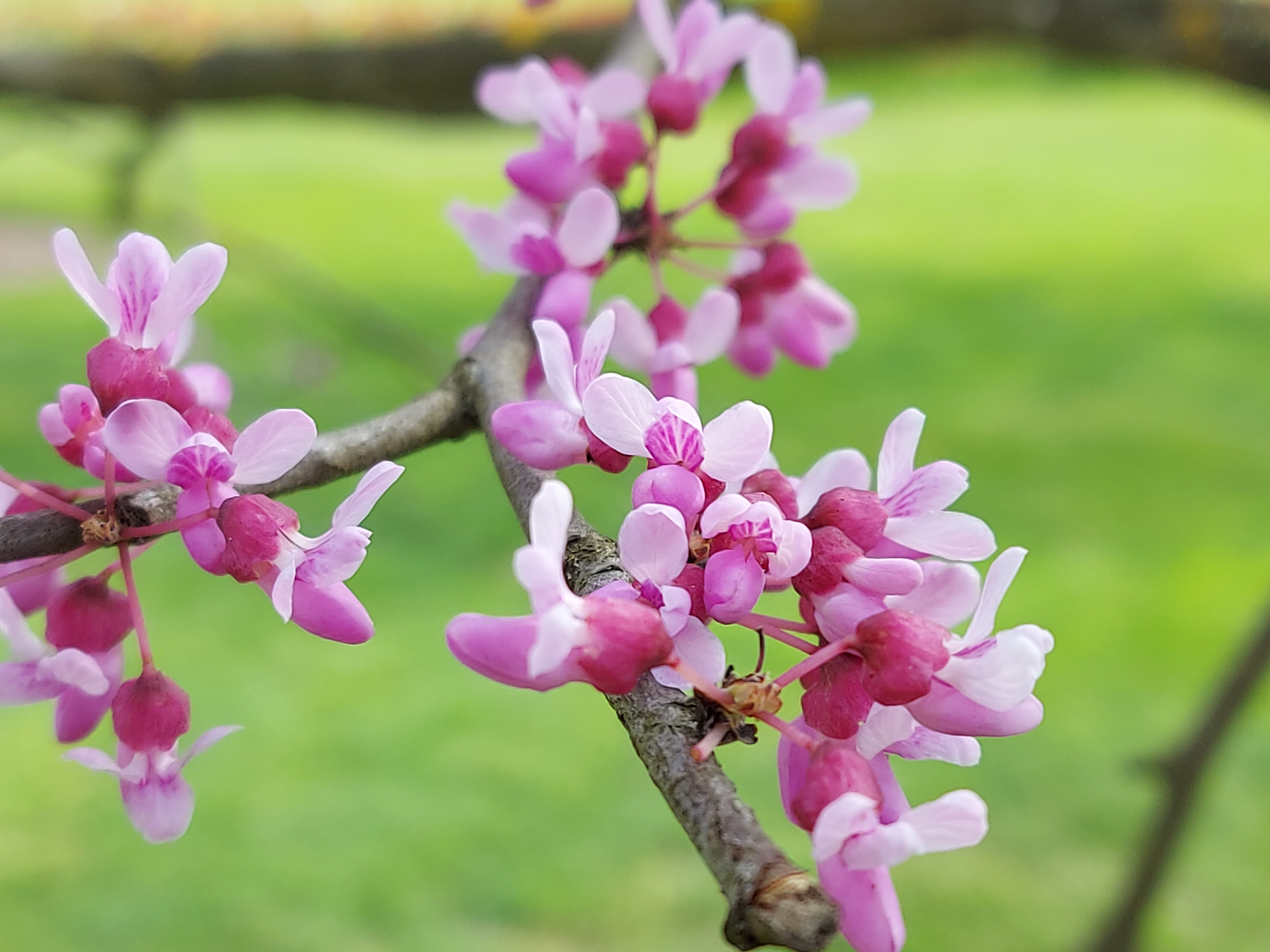
- In bloom at Volčji Potok Arboretum
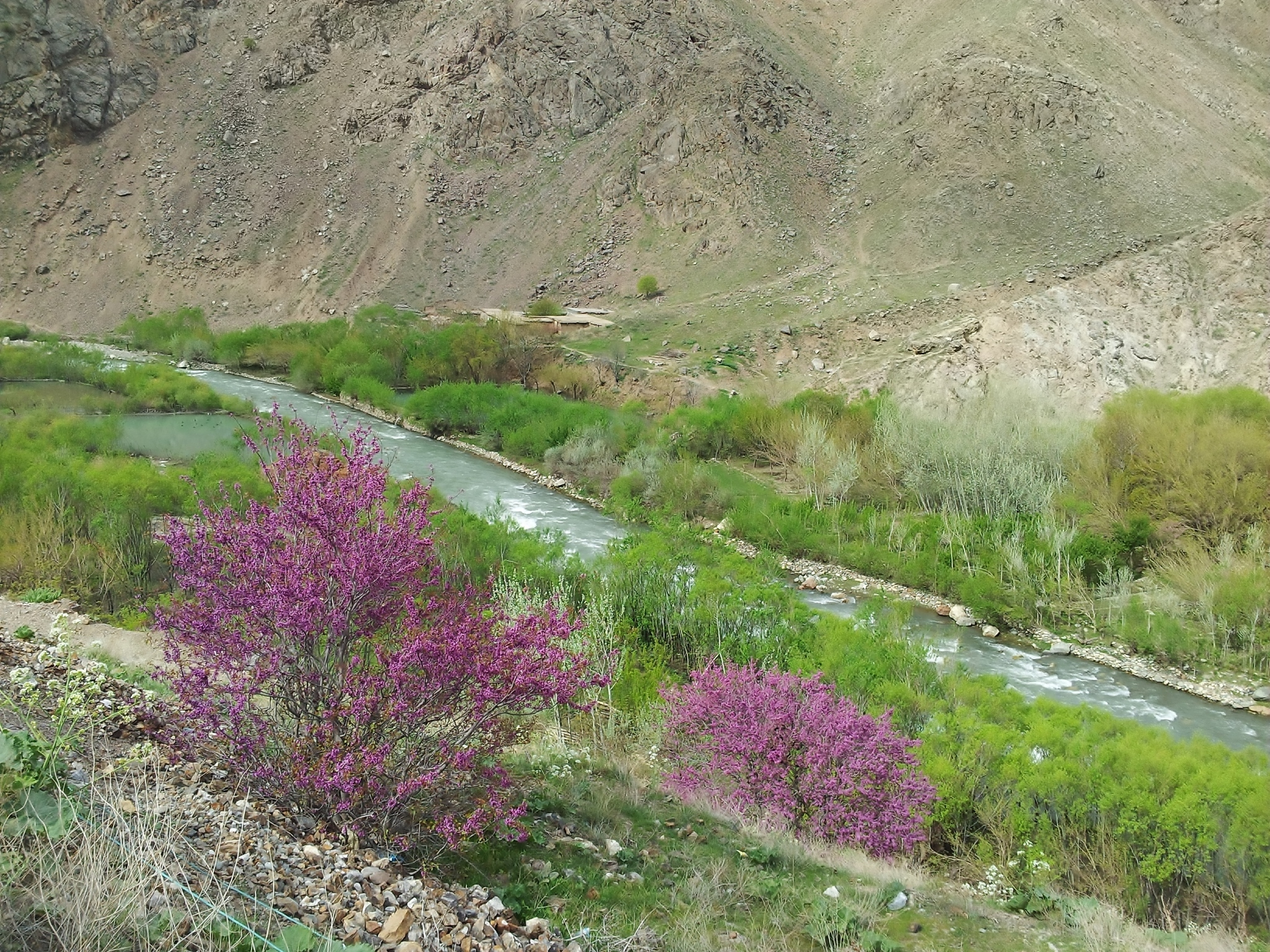
- Individuals in Parwan Province, Afghanistan

Conservation status
- Data Deficient (IUCN 3.1)

Scientific classification
- Kingdom: Plantae
- Clade: Tracheophytes
- Clade: Angiosperms
- Clade: Eudicots
- Clade: Rosids
- Order: Fabales
- Family: Fabaceae
- Genus: Cercis
- Species: C. griffithii

Binomial name
- Cercis griffithii Boiss.

= Cercis griffithii =

Species of plant

Cercis griffithii, the Afghan redbud or Griffith's redbud, is a species of flowering plant in the family Fabaceae. It is native to Central Asia, Iran, and Afghanistan, and it has been introduced to Romania. A shrub or small tree reaching 5 m (16 ft), its flowers appear before the leaves in spring. It is available from commercial nurseries.

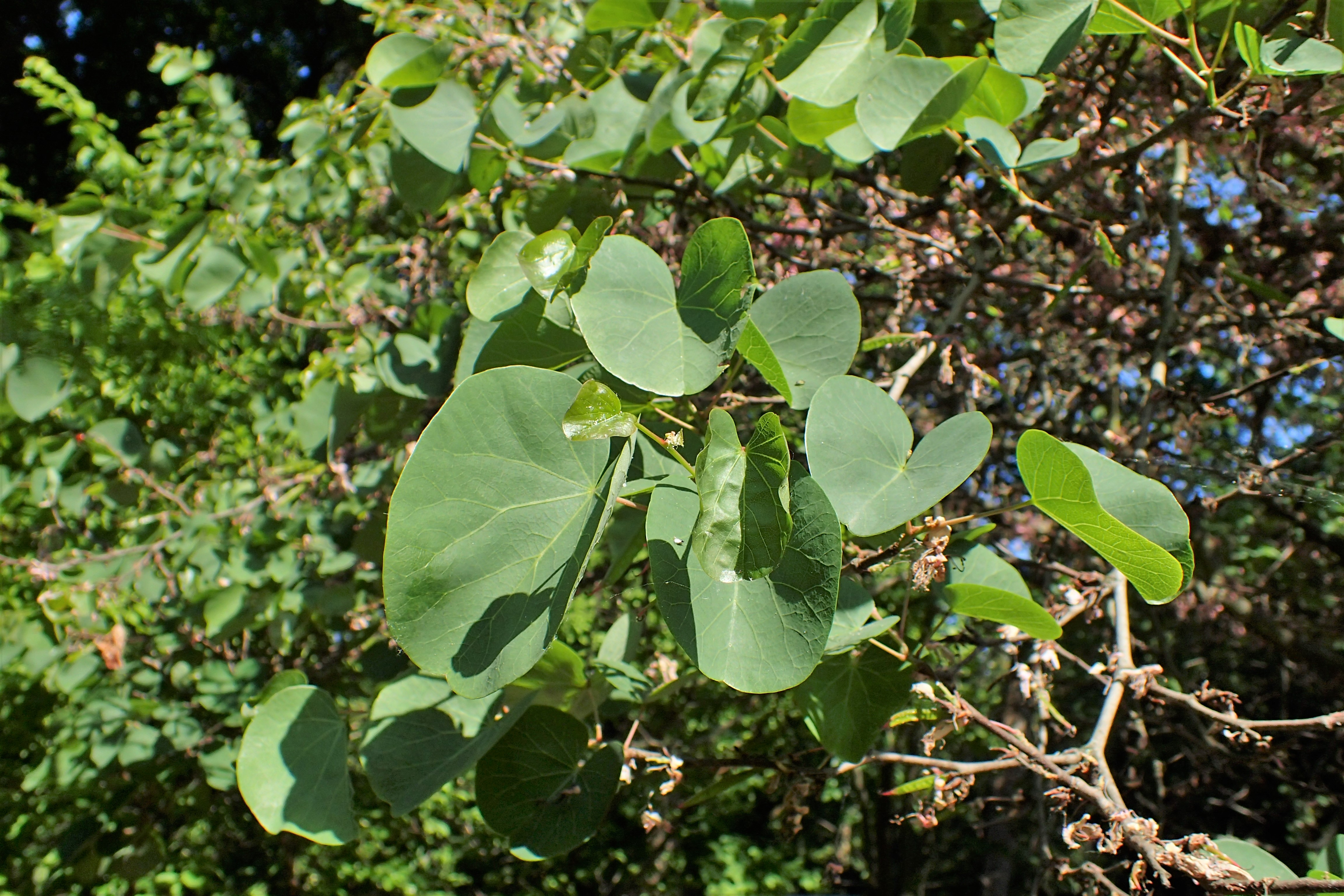
Leaves are cordate
