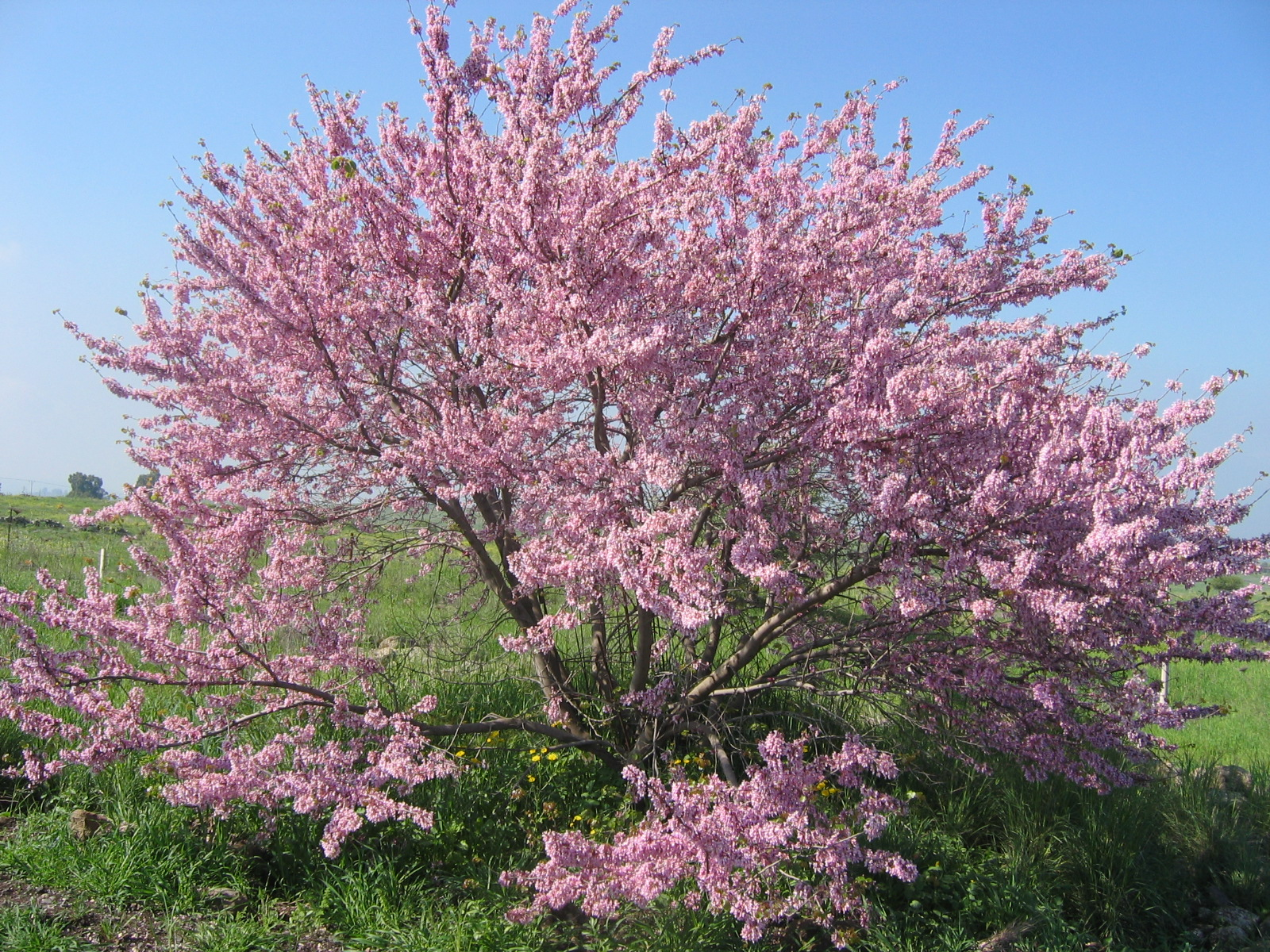

Conservation status
- Least Concern (IUCN 3.1)

Scientific classification
- Kingdom: Plantae
- Clade: Embryophytes
- Clade: Tracheophytes
- Clade: Spermatophytes
- Clade: Angiosperms
- Clade: Eudicots
- Clade: Rosids
- Order: Fabales
- Family: Fabaceae
- Genus: Cercis
- Species: C. siliquastrum

Binomial name
- Cercis siliquastrum L.

Synonyms
- Siliquastrum orbicularis Moench

= Cercis siliquastrum =

Species of tree

Cercis siliquastrum, commonly known as European Cercis, the Judas tree or Judas-tree, is a small deciduous species of redbud in the flowering plant family Fabaceae which is noted for its prolific display of deep pink flowers in spring. It is native to Southern Europe and Western Asia.

== Description ==
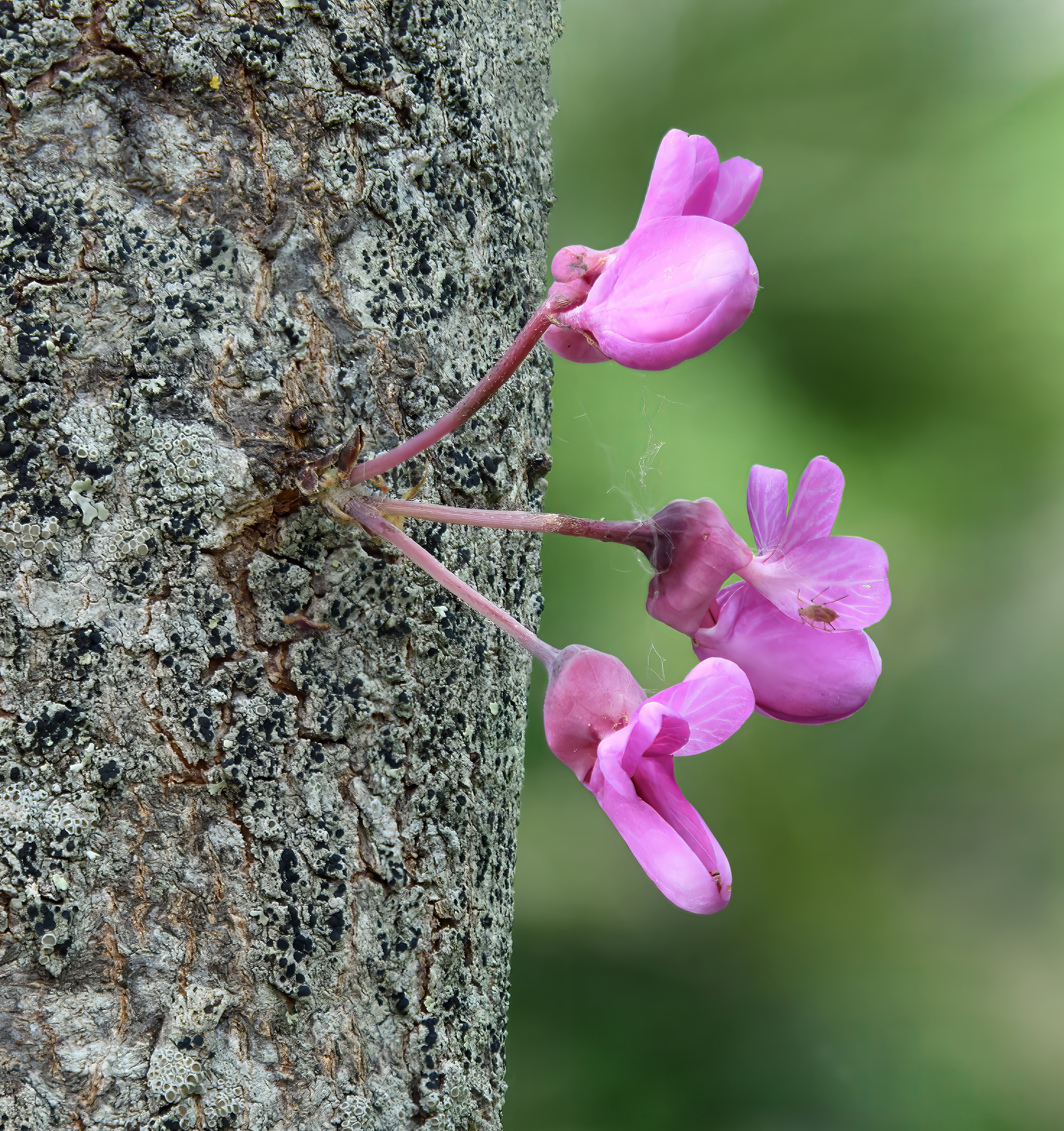
Flowers sprouting from old growth

blooming branch with flower cross sections

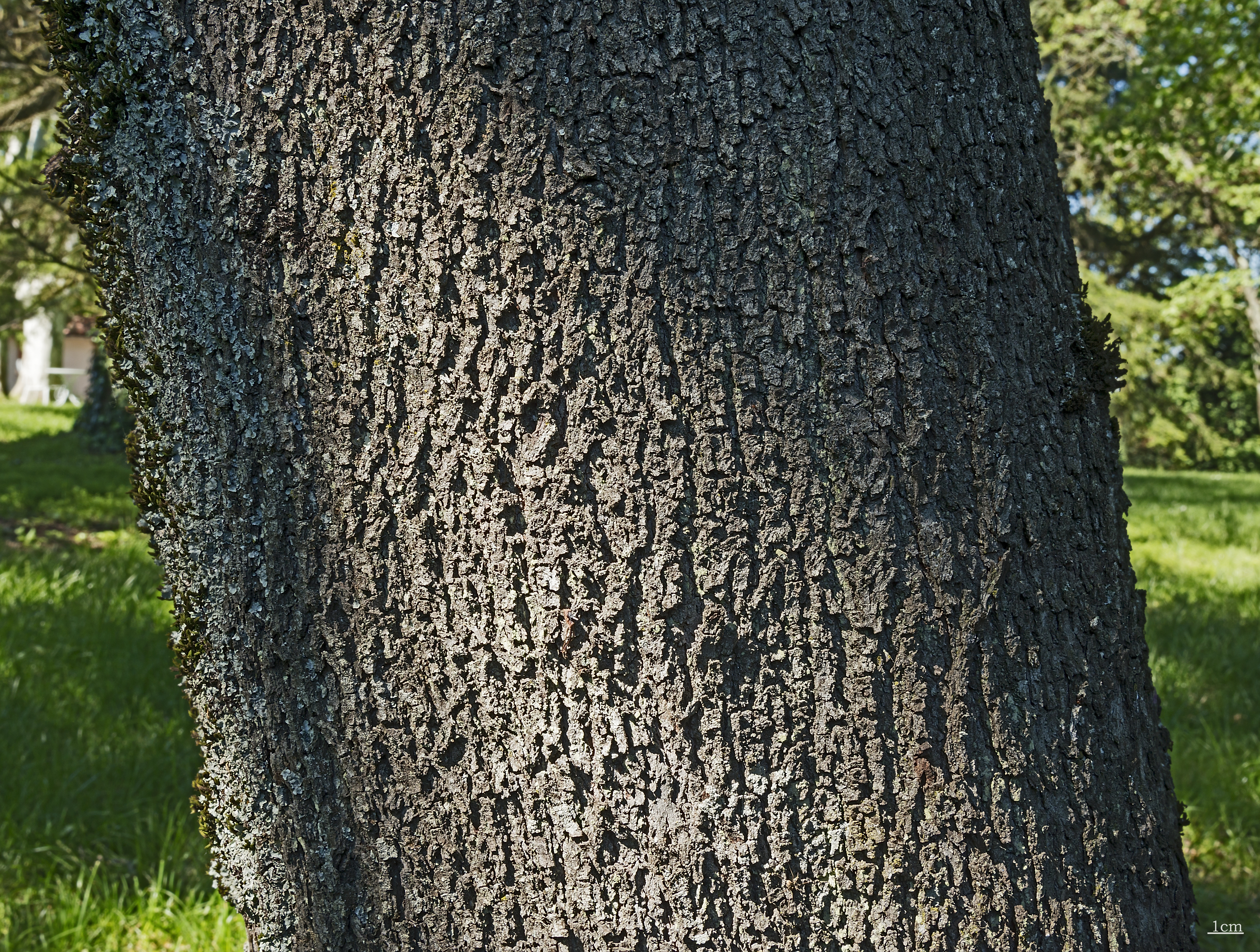
Trunk and bark

This species forms a small tree up to 12 m (39 ft) in height and 10 m (32 ft) in width.

The deep pink flowers are produced on year-old or older growth, including the trunk, in spring. They have five free petals and fused sepals, a flower shape typical of much of the pea family (Fabaceae). The leaves appear shortly after the first flowers emerge. These are cordate with a blunt apex and occasionally have a shallow notch at the tip. The tree produces long flat pods that hang vertically. The flowers are edible and reportedly have a sweet and tart taste.

== Taxonomy ==
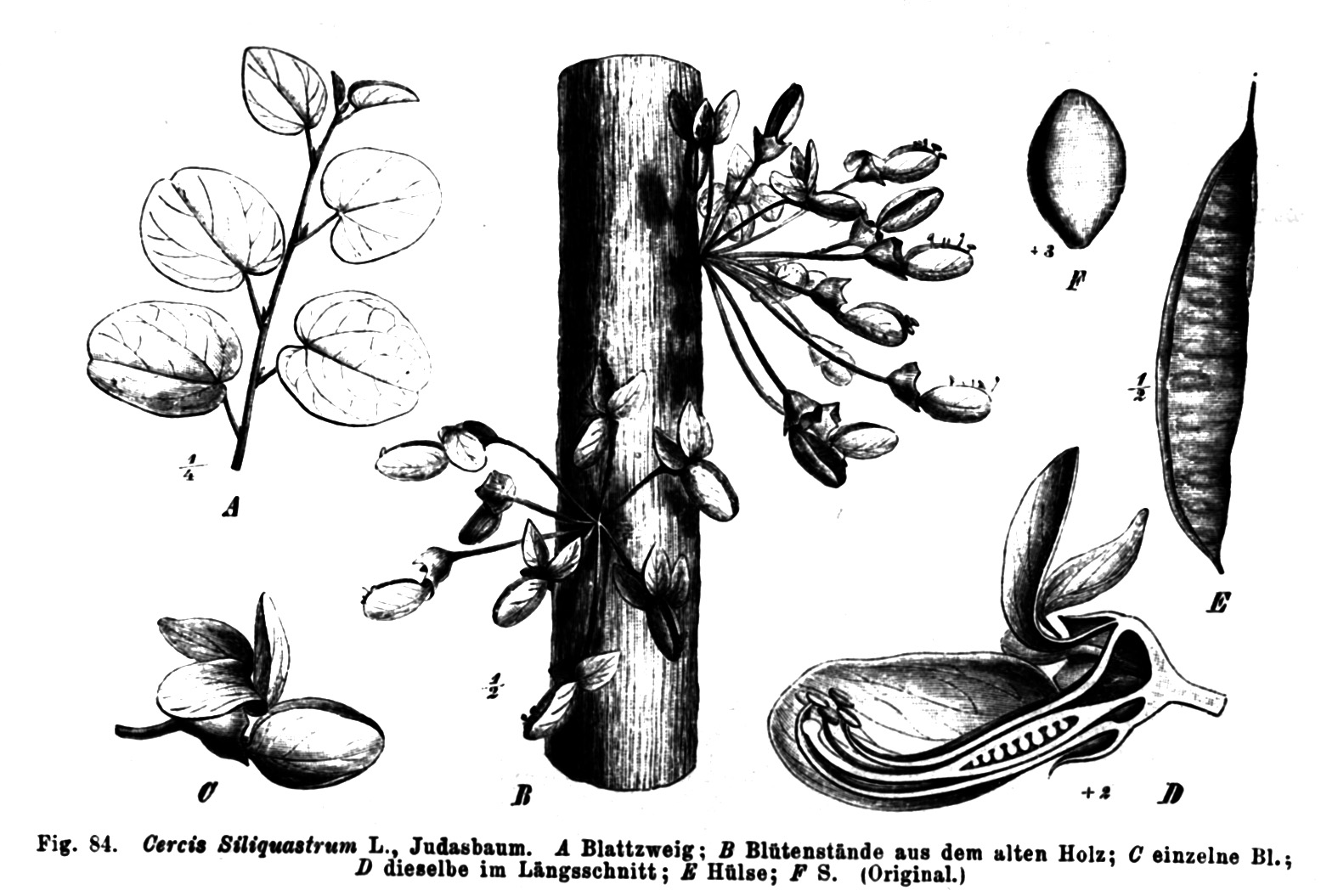
A botanical illustration from 1891

The species was first formally named by Carl Linnaeus in 1753, based on earlier accounts by Gaspard Bauhin as 'Siliqua sylvestris rotundifolia' (1623) and Rembert Dodoens as 'Arbor Judae' (1583). Linnaeus gave it the specific epithet siliquastrum, which is derived from the Latin word siliqua, meaning "pod", and the Latin suffix -astrum, usually meaning 'inferior to' or 'wild form'.

There are several varieties and subspecies including:-

- var. siliquastrum
- var. alba Weston
- var. hebecarpa Bornm.
- nothosubsp. yaltikirii (Ponert) Govaerts

== Distribution and ecological aspects ==
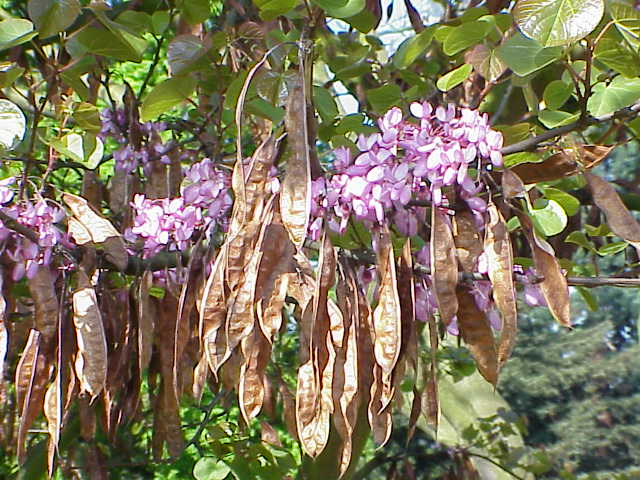
Flowers and pods

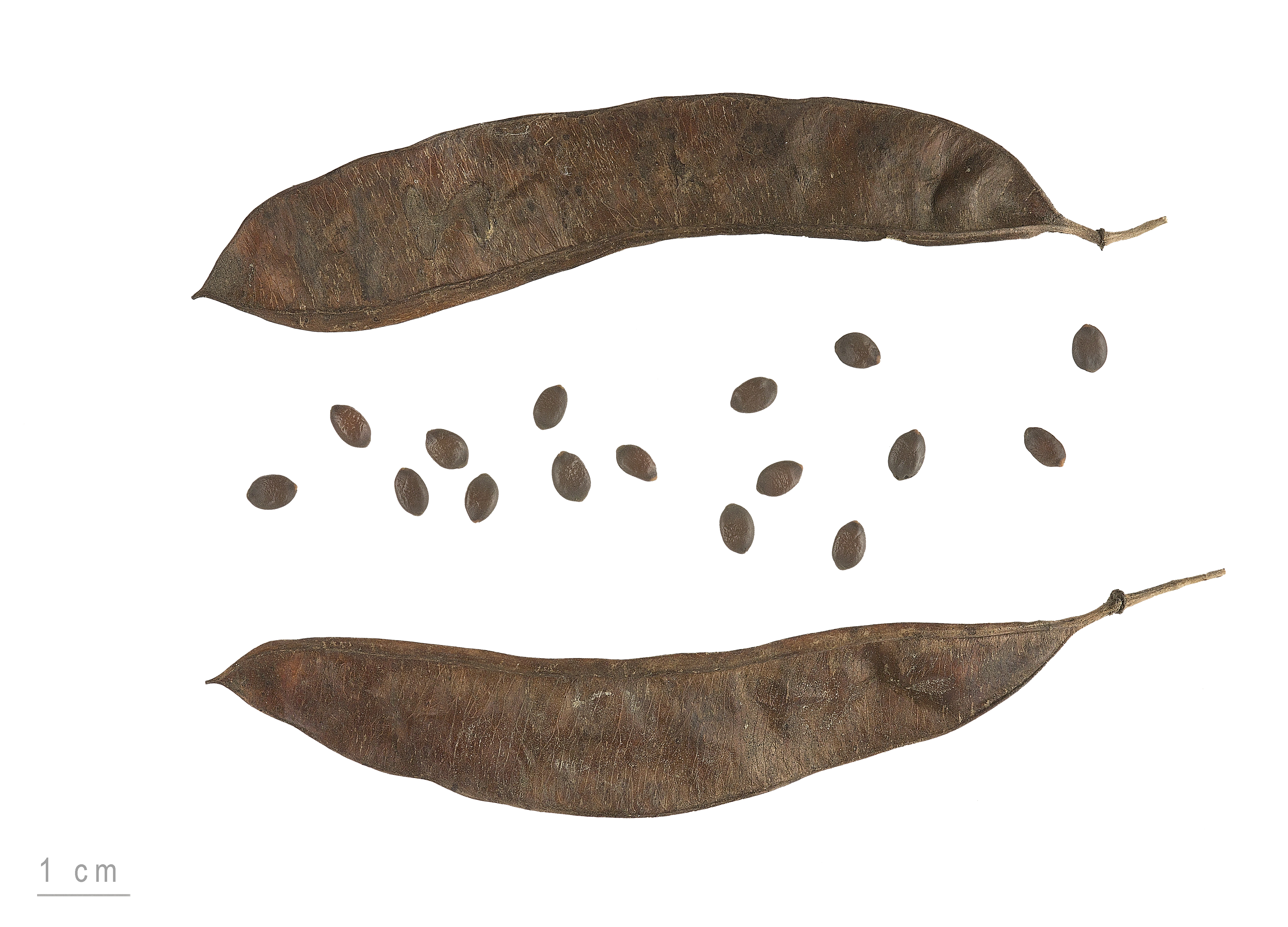
Cercis siliquastrum - MHNT

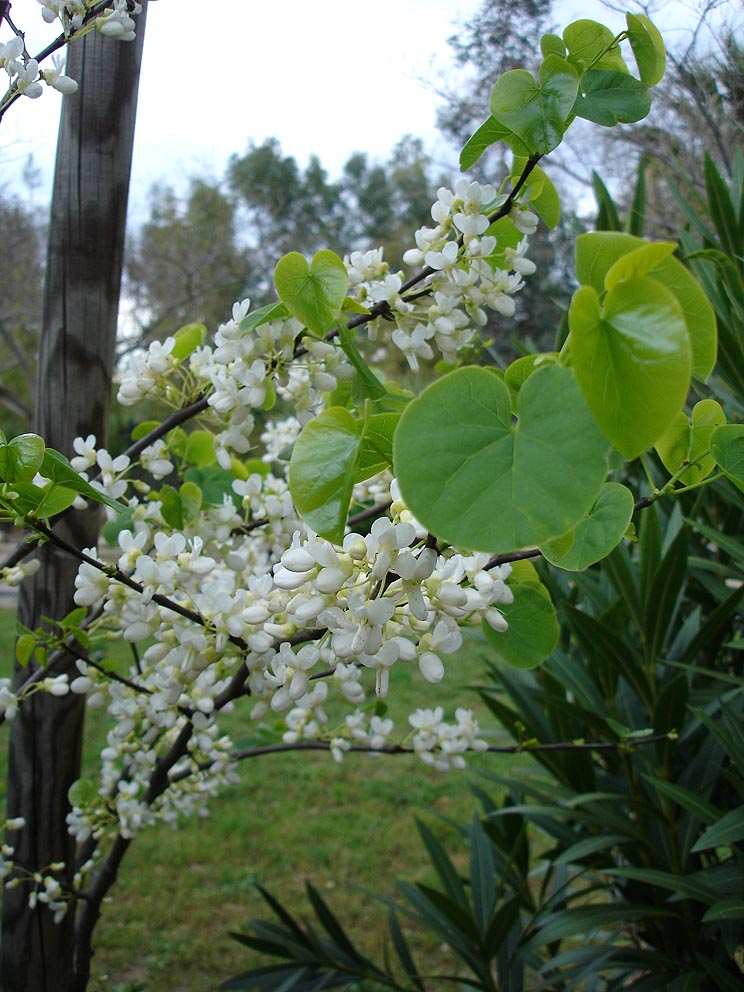
The cultivar 'Alba'

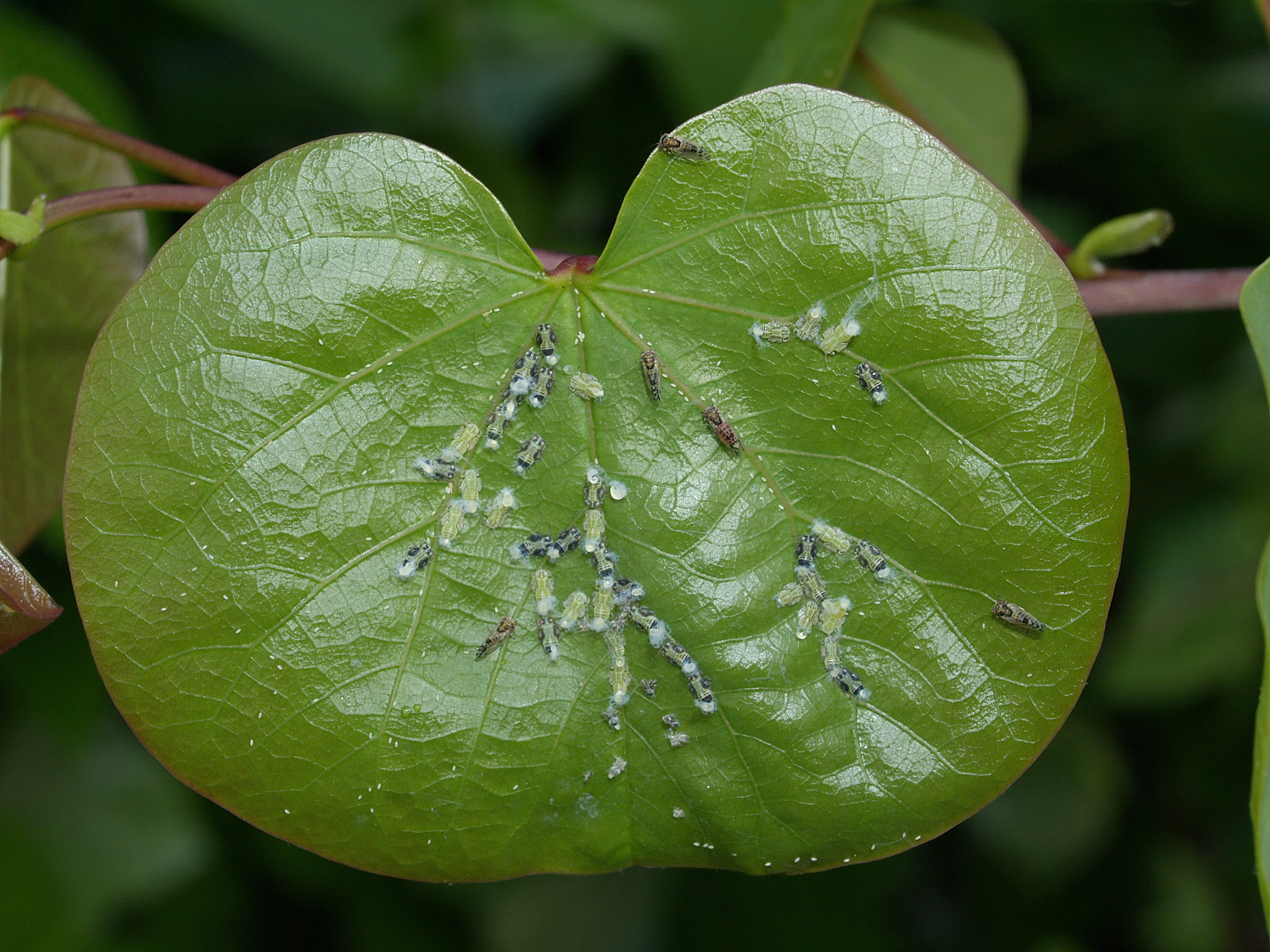
Psyllids (Cacopsylla pulchella) on a leaf

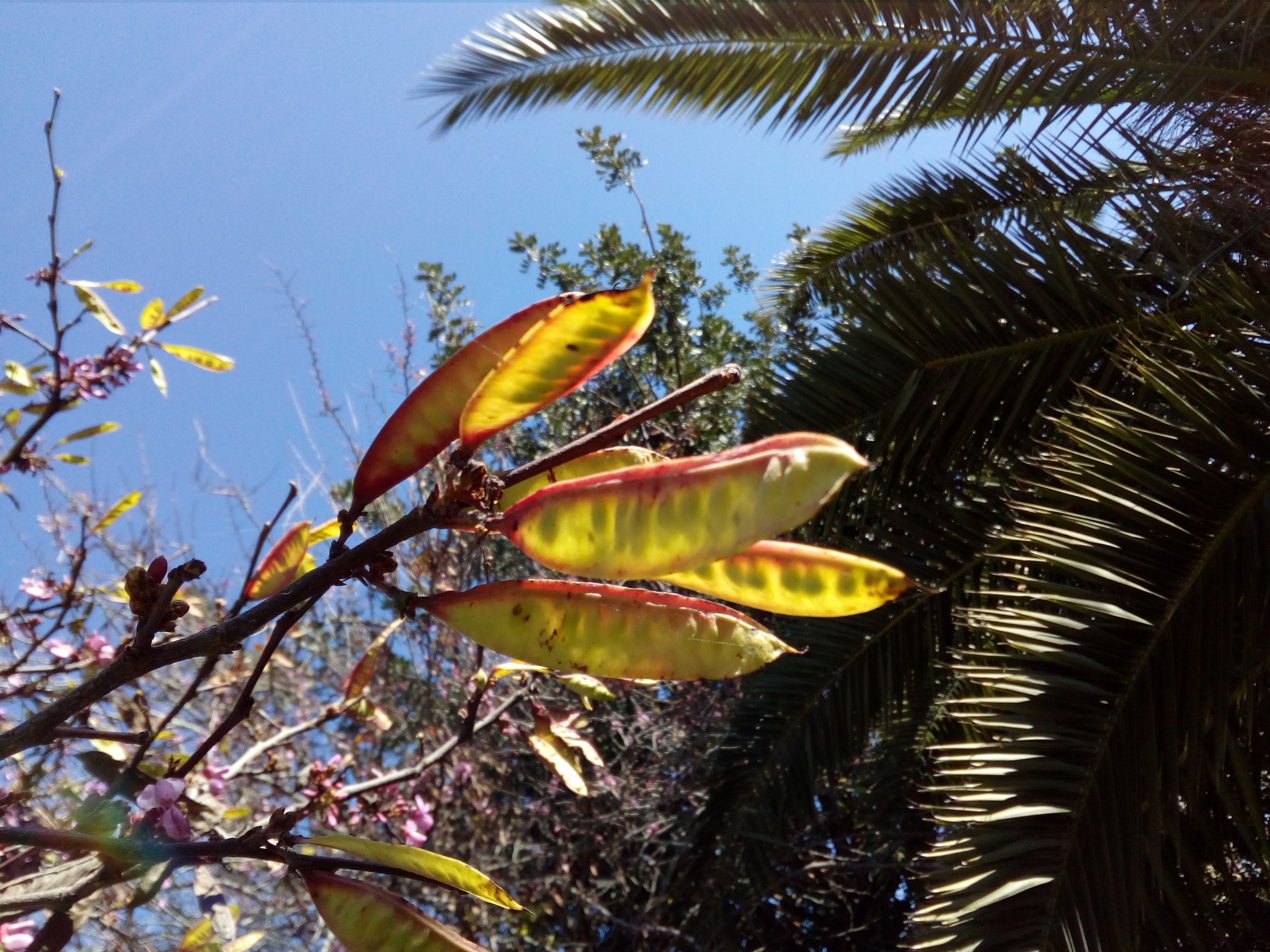
The pods are first green and then turn brown-red.

The flowers are pollinated by bees, which are attracted by nectar. Pollen from the protruding stamens is deposited on the bee's body and carried to another flower's stigma.

In Israel the tree has a status of a protected plant.

British journalist Francis McCullagh reported seeing "innumerable" flowering specimens of this tree in Yildiz Park in Istanbul in April 1909.

== Cultivation ==
The species prefers deep, well-drained soils and a position in full sun or partial shade.

Cultivars include:

- 'Afghan Deep Purple'
- 'Alba' - white flowers
- 'Bodnant'
- 'Carnea'
- 'Fructa Rubra'
- 'Penduliflora'
- 'Rubra' - dark pink-purple flowers
- 'Sterilis'
- 'Variegata'
- 'White Swan'

The cultivar 'Bodnant' has gained the Royal Horticultural Society's Award of Garden Merit. (confirmed 2017).

The tree is susceptible to leafhoppers, scale insects and psyllids (specifically Cacopsylla pulchella) as well as diseases including canker, coral spot and verticillium wilt.

Propagation is by seed, cuttings or budding.

The species produces hard wood with an attractive grain. It is used in veneers and polishes well.

== Etymology and culture ==
There is a myth that Judas Iscariot hanged himself from a tree of this species, causing its white flowers to turn red. The belief that Judas hanged himself on a Cercis siliquastrum tree likely originated from a translation error. Cercis trees, common in the Middle East, were referred to as 'arbre de Judée' in French, meaning Judea's tree, referring to the hilly regions of that country where the tree used to be common. The story about Judas and the blushing redbud appears to be a result of linguistic evolution and cultural folklore. Another possible source for the vernacular name is the fact that the flowers and seedpods can dangle directly from the trunk in a way reminiscent of Judas's possible method of suicide. The tree also has alternative names such as "love tree" or "redbud".

A sermon illustration on the deadly effects of succumbing to temptation refers to a false idea that the Judas tree killed bees drawn to it: "Dr. Cuyler forcibly illustrates this by reference to the Judas tree. The blossoms appear before the leaves, and they are of a brilliant crimson. The flaming beauty of the flowers attracts innumerable insects; and the wandering bee is drawn after it to gather honey. But every bee which alights upon the blossom, imbibes a fatal opiate, and drops dead from among the crimson flowers to the earth."

Judas trees in Istanbul, Turkey, especially along the Bosphorus, give their distinctive purple color in spring. It is one of the important images of Byzantium and Christianity. The purple of the Judas tree flower resembles the color used in the clothes of Byzantine rulers. It was a sign of wealth and power, as it was the most difficult color to be produced naturally. Except for the emperor, no one could wear the color purple.

Judas trees have been the symbol of Bursa, Turkey, for centuries. "Erguvan (redbud) festivals" began in the 14th century because Emir Sultan, one of the Muslim Anatolian saints, son-in-law of the Ottoman Empire sultan Bayezid I, met with his followers in Bursa every year during the Judas tree's blooming season; they continued as a tradition until the 19th century because of their positive effects on the city's economy. There is a present effort to revive these festivities.

== Traditional medicine ==
The Judas tree is referred to as a traditional medicinal plant in the Middle East.
