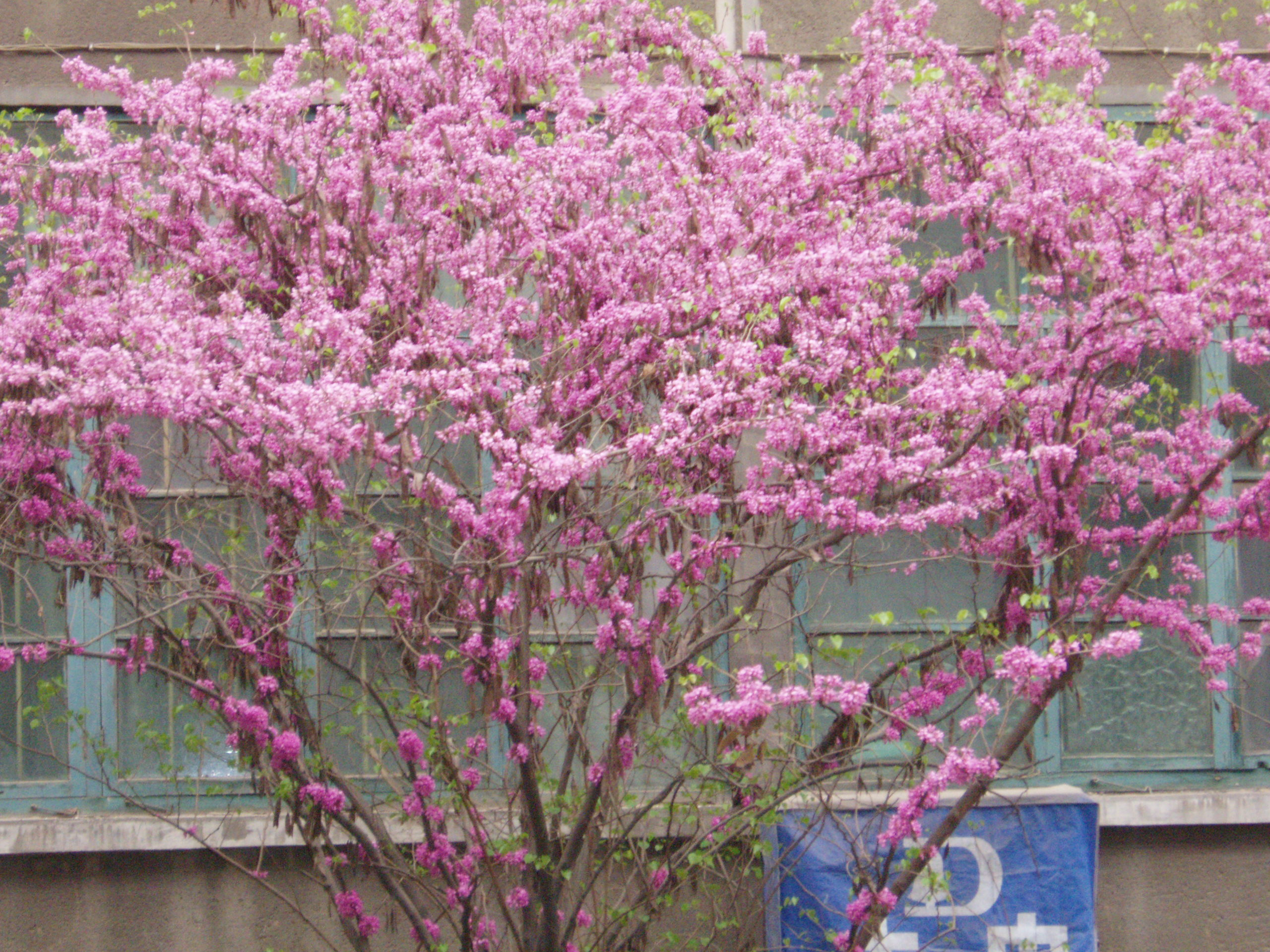

Conservation status
- Least Concern (IUCN 3.1)

Scientific classification
- Kingdom: Plantae
- Clade: Tracheophytes
- Clade: Angiosperms
- Clade: Eudicots
- Clade: Rosids
- Order: Fabales
- Family: Fabaceae
- Genus: Cercis
- Species: C. chinensis

Binomial name
- Cercis chinensis Bunge (1835)

Synonyms
- Cercis canadensis var. chinensis (Bunge) Ito (1900); Cercis chinensis f. alba S.C.Hsu (1966); Cercis chinensis f. leucantha Sugim. (1977); Cercis chinensis f. pubescens C.F.Wei (1983); Cercis chinensis f. rosea P.S.Hsu (1966); Cercis japonica Siebold ex Planch. (1853); Cercis pauciflora H.L.Li (1944); Cercis pubescens S.Y.Wang (1980)

= Cercis chinensis =

Chinese redbud

Species of tree

Cercis chinensis, the Chinese redbud, (simplified Chinese: 紫荆; traditional Chinese: 紫荊; pinyin: Zǐjīng) is a plant in the legume family Fabaceae. It is endemic to China, where it grows in southern and north-central China and Manchuria.

== Description ==
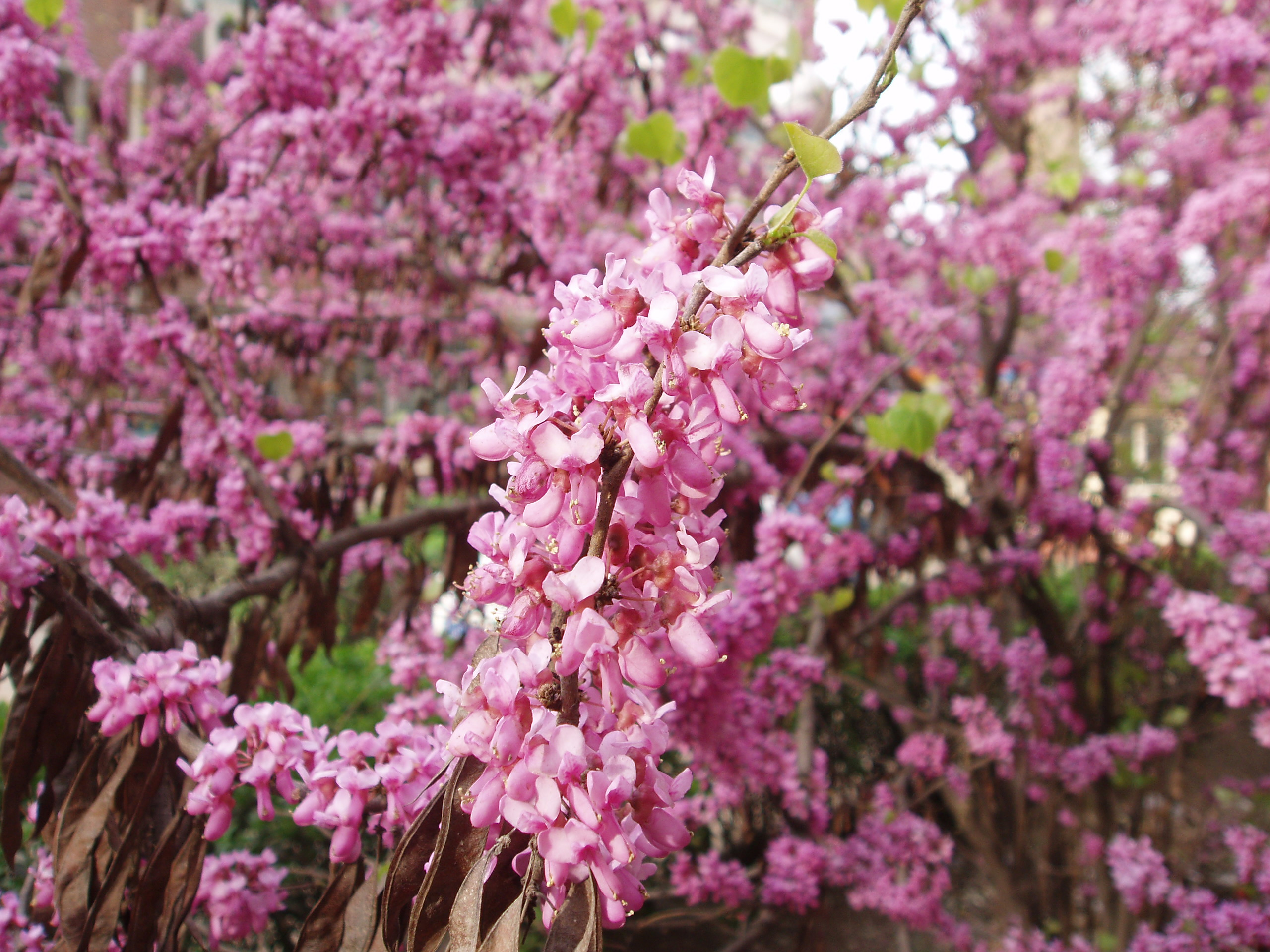

As a tree, the Chinese redbud may grow up to 15 metres (49 ft) tall with a trunk diameter of up to 50 centimetres (20 in), however, the species is normally found growing in shrub form. The flowers are pink or milky white in color whilst the leaf body is almost circular in shape, 6 to 14 centimetres (2.4 to 5.5 in) in length and tapers to a point at the end. Flowering in April in the Northern Hemisphere and in September in the Southern Hemisphere, and produces fruit in October and March, respectively.

The Chinese cercis (Cercis chinensis) Bunge is a native of China and a member of the Fabaceae family, which is extensively dispersed there. Its many parts can be utilized for traditional Chinese medicine, which dates back a long way, in addition to its high beauty value.

== Cultivation ==
Although hardy, in cultivation this plant requires a sheltered spot in a southerly or westerly aspect, with damp well-drained soil.

The following cultivars have gained the Royal Horticultural Society's Award of Garden Merit (confirmed 2017):

- C. chinensis 'Avondale'
- C. chinensis 'Don Egolf'
Cercis chinensis 'Avondale'

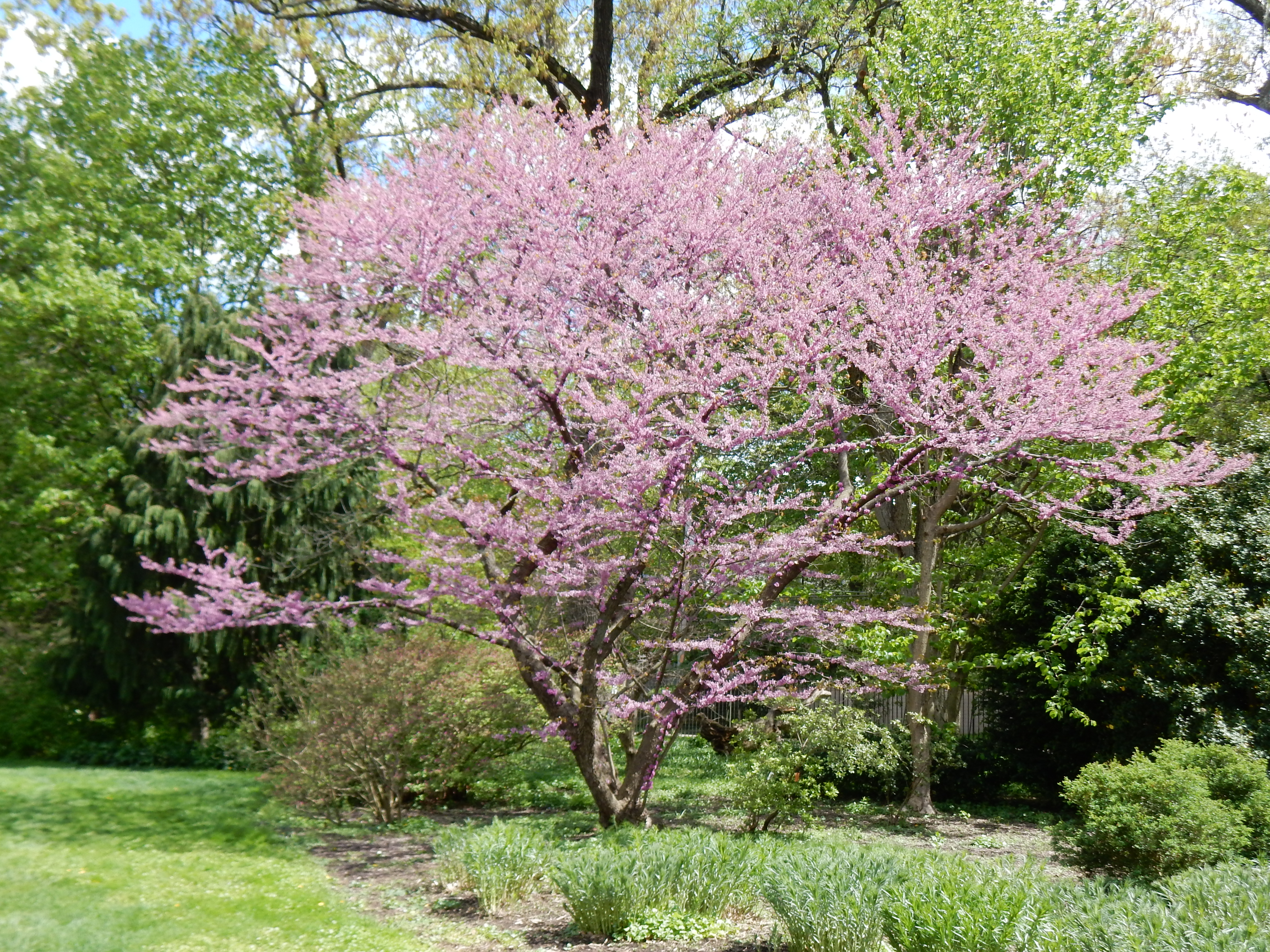

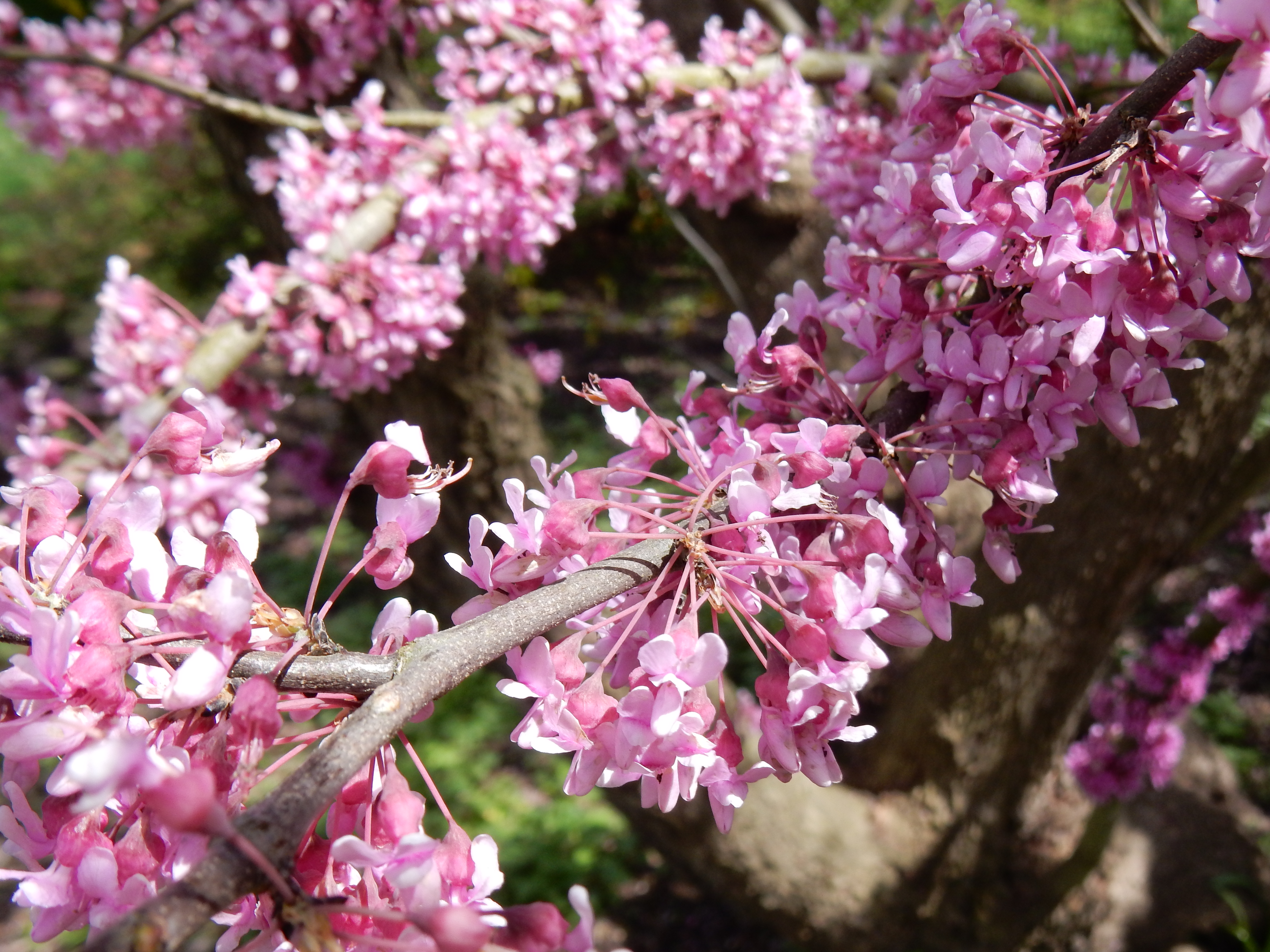

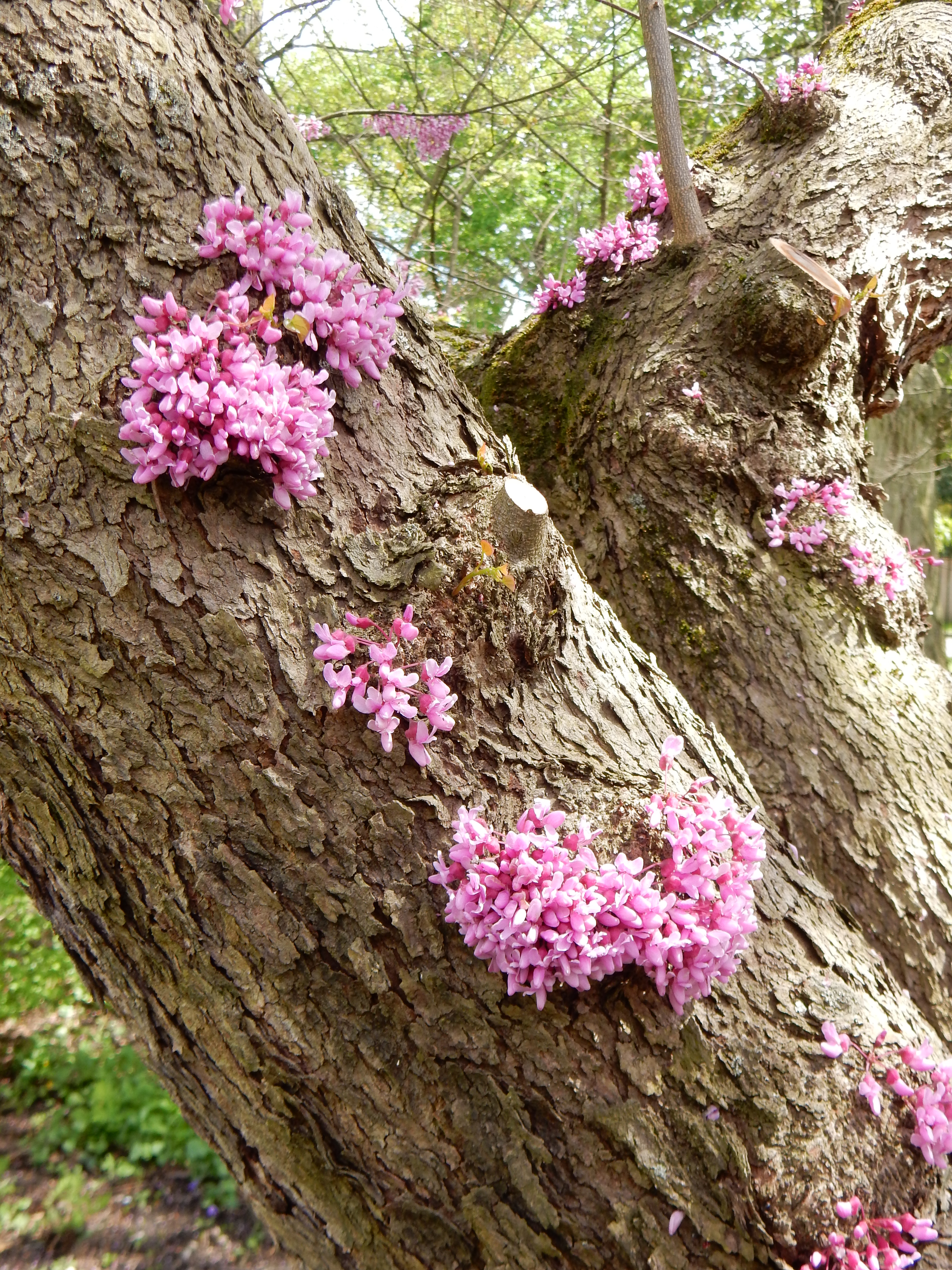

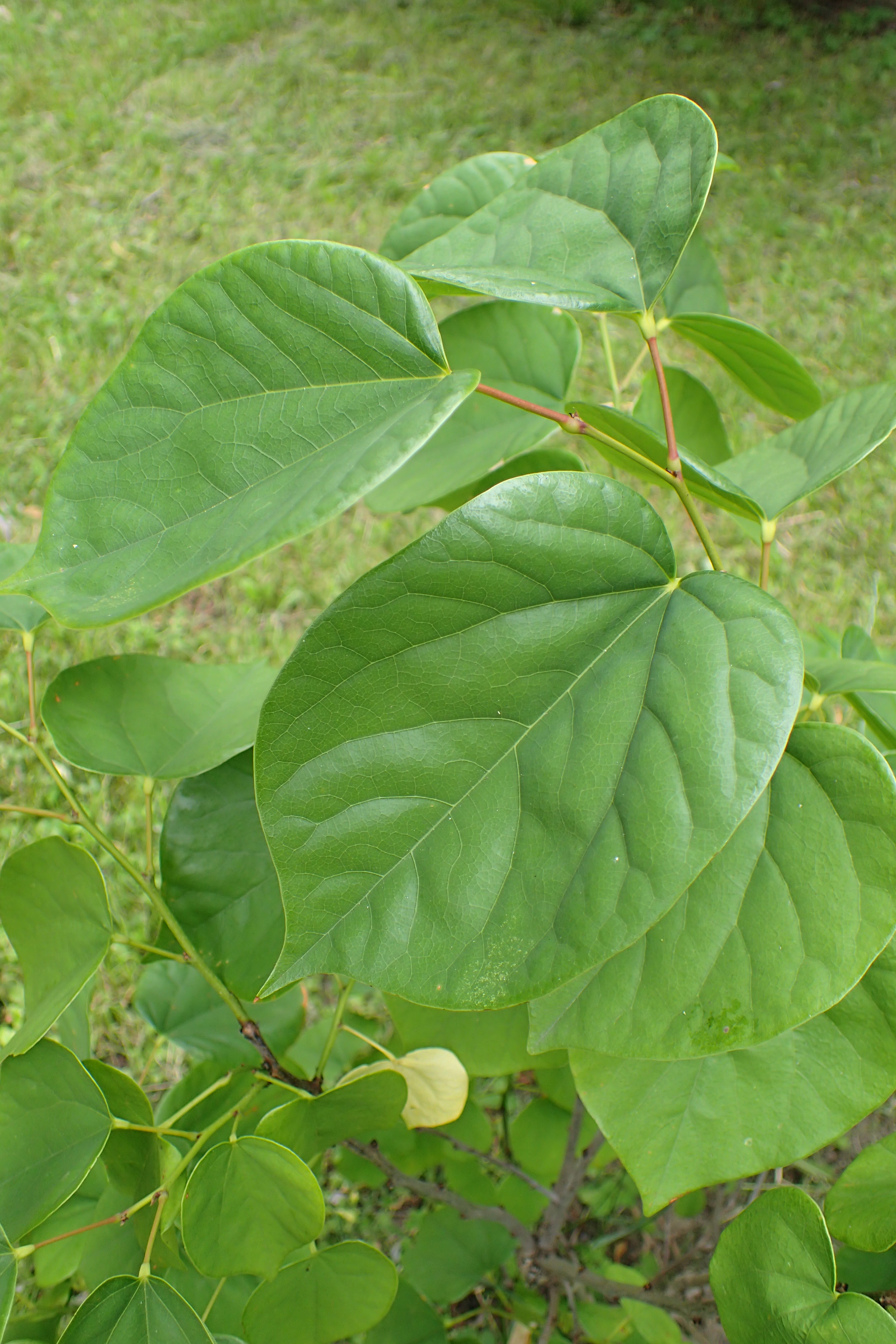
