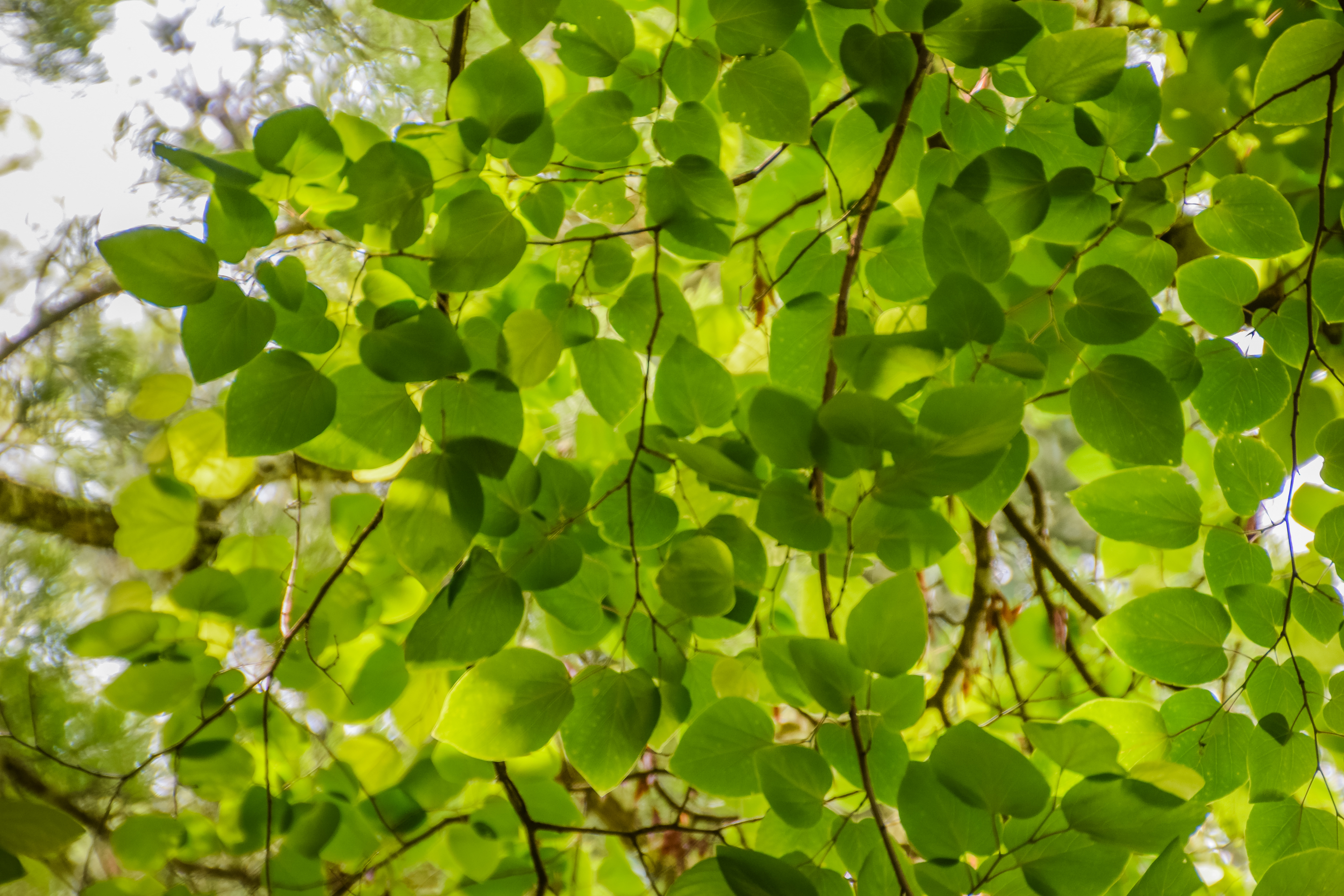
- In Eastwoodhill Arboretum

Conservation status
- Least Concern (IUCN 3.1)

Scientific classification
- Kingdom: Plantae
- Clade: Tracheophytes
- Clade: Angiosperms
- Clade: Eudicots
- Clade: Rosids
- Order: Fabales
- Family: Fabaceae
- Genus: Cercis
- Species: C. racemosa

Binomial name
- Cercis racemosa Oliv.

= Cercis racemosa =

Species of plant

Cercis racemosa, the chain-flowered redbud, is a species of flowering plant in the family Fabaceae. It is native to central and southern China. A open-habit tree reaching 8 to 15 m (26 to 49 ft), it is found in dense forests, and on mountain slopes, but it is also adaptable enough to human disturbances to be found near roads and villages, typically at elevations from 1,000 to 1,900 m (3,300 to 6,200 ft). It flowers in May. Widespread and numerous, it has been assessed as Least Concern. With its wisteria-like racemes of up to 40 pendulous flowers, and hardy in USDA Zones 7 to 9, it has some potential as an ornamental, and may be available from commercial nurseries. Plant collector Ernest Henry Wilson considered it one of the most beautiful trees he had ever introduced to the West.
