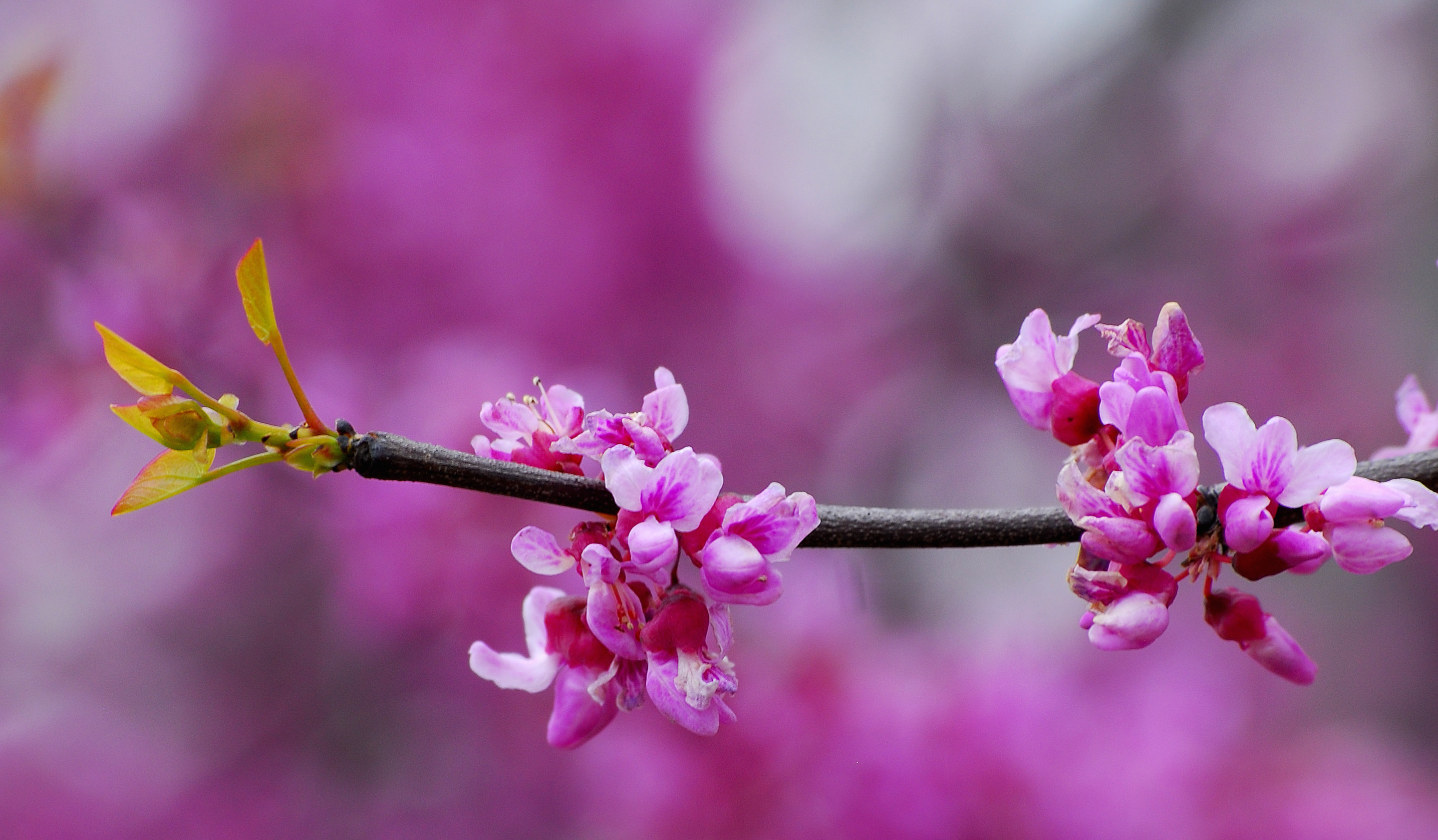
- C. siliquastrum (Judas tree)

Scientific classification
- Kingdom: Plantae
- Clade: Tracheophytes
- Clade: Angiosperms
- Clade: Eudicots
- Clade: Rosids
- Order: Fabales
- Family: Fabaceae
- Tribe: Cercideae
- Genus: Cercis; L.

Type species
- Cercis siliquastrum L. (1753)

Species
- 10–24; see text

Synonyms
- Siliquastrum Duhamel (1755), nom. superfl.

= Cercis =

Genus of flowering plants in the bean family

Cercis /ˈsɜːrsɪs/ is a genus of flowering plants in the subfamily Cercidoideae of the pea family Fabaceae. It contains small deciduous trees or large shrubs commonly known for the Judas tree in Europe or as redbuds in the USA. They are characterised by simple, rounded to heart-shaped leaves and pinkish-red flowers borne in the early spring on bare leafless shoots, on both branches and trunk ("cauliflory"). The genus contains ten species, native to warm temperate regions of North America, southern Europe, western and central Asia, and China.

The generic name Cercis is derived from the Greek word κερκις (kerkis) meaning "weaver's shuttle", which was applied by Theophrastus to C. siliquastrum due to the resemblance of the dry seed pod to a loom shuttle.

Cercis species are used as food plants by the larvae of some Lepidoptera species including mouse moth and Automeris io (both recorded on eastern redbud). The bark of C. chinensis has been used in Chinese medicine as an antiseptic.

Cercis fossils have been found that date to the Eocene.

== Species ==
Cercis comprises the following species:

Flowers	Leaves	Scientific name	Common name	Distribution
		Cercis canadensis L.	eastern redbud	eastern North America
		Cercis chinensis Bunge	Chinese redbud	East Asia
		Cercis chingii Chun	Ching's redbud	China
		Cercis chuniana F.P.Metcalf		China
		Cercis glabra Pamp.	Yunnan redbud	China
		Cercis griffithii Boiss.	Afghan redbud	southern central Asia
		Cercis occidentalis Torr. ex A. Gray	western redbud	Western United States
		Cercis orbiculata Greene	intermountain redbud	Arizona and Utah
		Cercis racemosa Oliv.	chain-flowered redbud	western China
		Cercis siliquastrum L.	Judas tree or European redbud	Mediterranean region

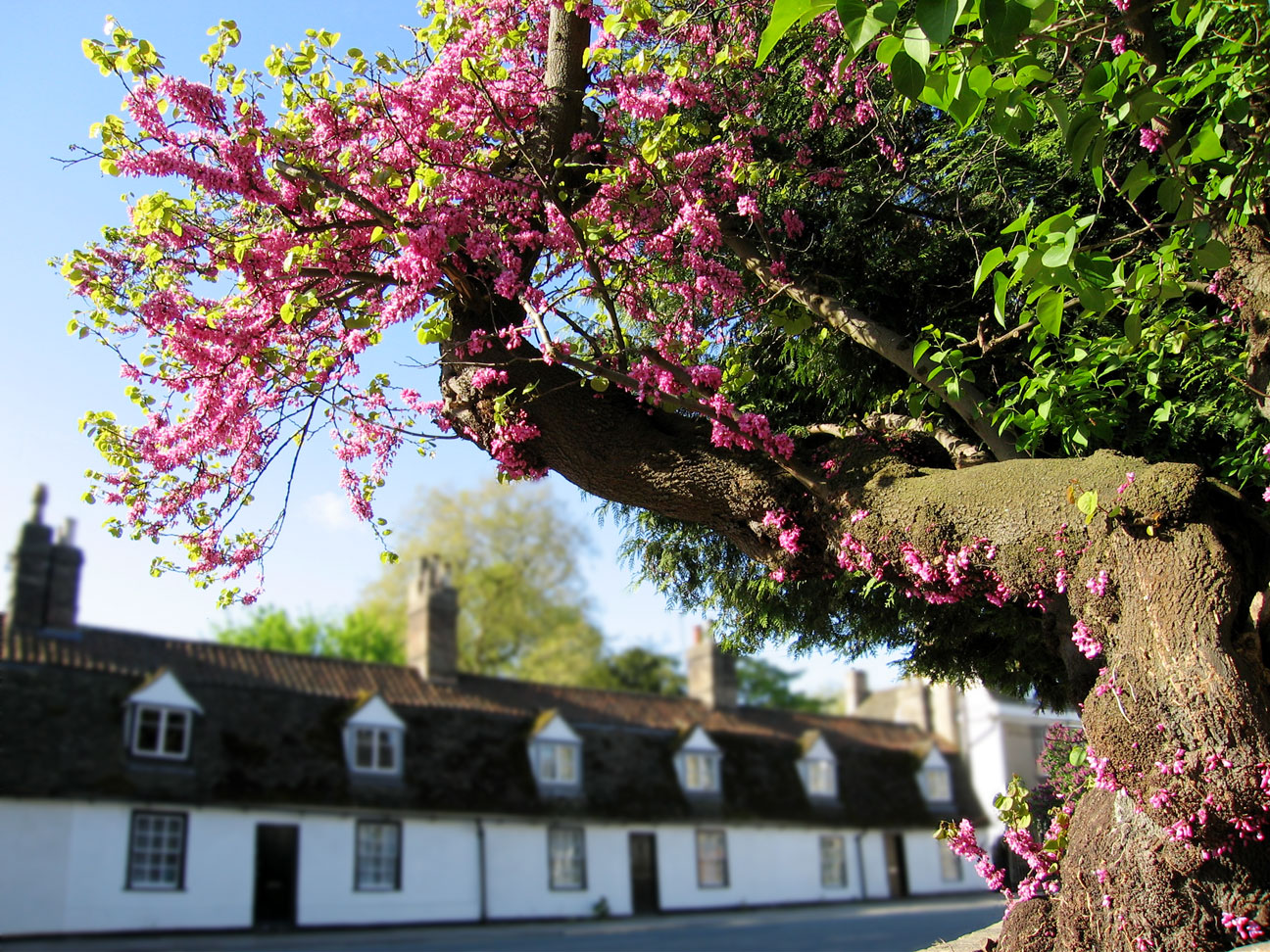
The Judas tree (Cercis siliquastrum) often bears flowers directly on its trunk.

The Judas tree (Cercis siliquastrum) is 10–15 m tall tree native to the south of Europe and southwest Asia. It is found in Iberia, southern France, Italy, Bulgaria, Greece, and Asia Minor, and forms a low tree with a flat spreading head. In early spring it is covered with a profusion of magenta flowers which appear before the leaves. The flowers are edible and are sometimes eaten in a mixed salad or made into fritters with a flavor described as an agreeably acidic bite. The tree was frequently figured in the 16th and 17th-century herbals. It is said to be the tree from which Judas Iscariot hanged himself after betraying Christ, but the name may also derive from "Judea's tree", after the region encompassing Israel and Palestine where the tree is commonplace.

A smaller Eastern American woodland understory tree, the eastern redbud, Cercis canadensis, is common from southernmost Canada to Piedmont, Alabama, and East Texas. It differs from C. siliquastrum in its pointed leaves and slightly smaller size (rarely over 12 m tall). The flowers are also used in salads and for making pickled relish, while the inner bark of twigs gives a mustard-yellow dye. It is commonly grown as an ornamental.

The related western redbud, Cercis occidentalis, ranges from California east to Utah primarily in foothill regions. Its leaves are more rounded at the tip than the relatively heart-shaped leaves of the eastern redbud. The tree often forms multi-trunked colonies that are covered in bright pink flowers in early spring (February–March). White-flowered variants are in cultivation. It buds only once a year.

The species of Cercis in North America form a clade. Hopkins (1942) established a two-species system for North America which is still widely recognized. Alternatively, based on an exploratory morphometric analysis, Isely (1975) inferred up to six separate entities (“phases”). Barneby (1989) recognized only one continental species and treated all of western North American Cercis as C. canadensis var. orbiculata, but the justification was cursory and not definitive. Morphometric studies of North American Cercis indicate that, although morphological variation is strongly correlated with geography across North America, considerable overlap in flower, fruit, and leaf characters limit their use for taxon delimitation.

In contrast to morphology, molecular phylogenetic analyses recover three geographically well-defined clades within North America, with California Cercis forming a clade that is sister to a clade formed by Colorado Plateau and eastern North American clades. Molecular dating suggests a divergence time among these three clades of at least 12 million years. These clades were also inferred from a distance-based analysis of Cercis in the United States with isozyme data as reported in an unpublished Ph.D. dissertation (Ballenger 1992). On the basis of these studies, Cercis is treated as comprising three North American species, with the Colorado Plateau and all Arizona specimens recognized as C. orbiculata, distinct from C. occidentalis from California and C. canadensis from eastern North America. This delimitation of species will also be employed for the treatment of the genus for Flora of North America (Ballenger and Vincent, in preparation).

The chain-flowered redbud (Cercis racemosa) from western China is unusual in the genus in having its flowers in pendulous 10 cm (4 in) racemes, as in a Laburnum, rather than short clusters.

== Wood ==
The wood is medium weight, somewhat brittle, of light tan color with a noticeably large heartwood area of darker brown, tinged with red. The wood has attractive figuring and is used in wood turning, for making decorative items and in the production of wood veneer.

== Gallery ==
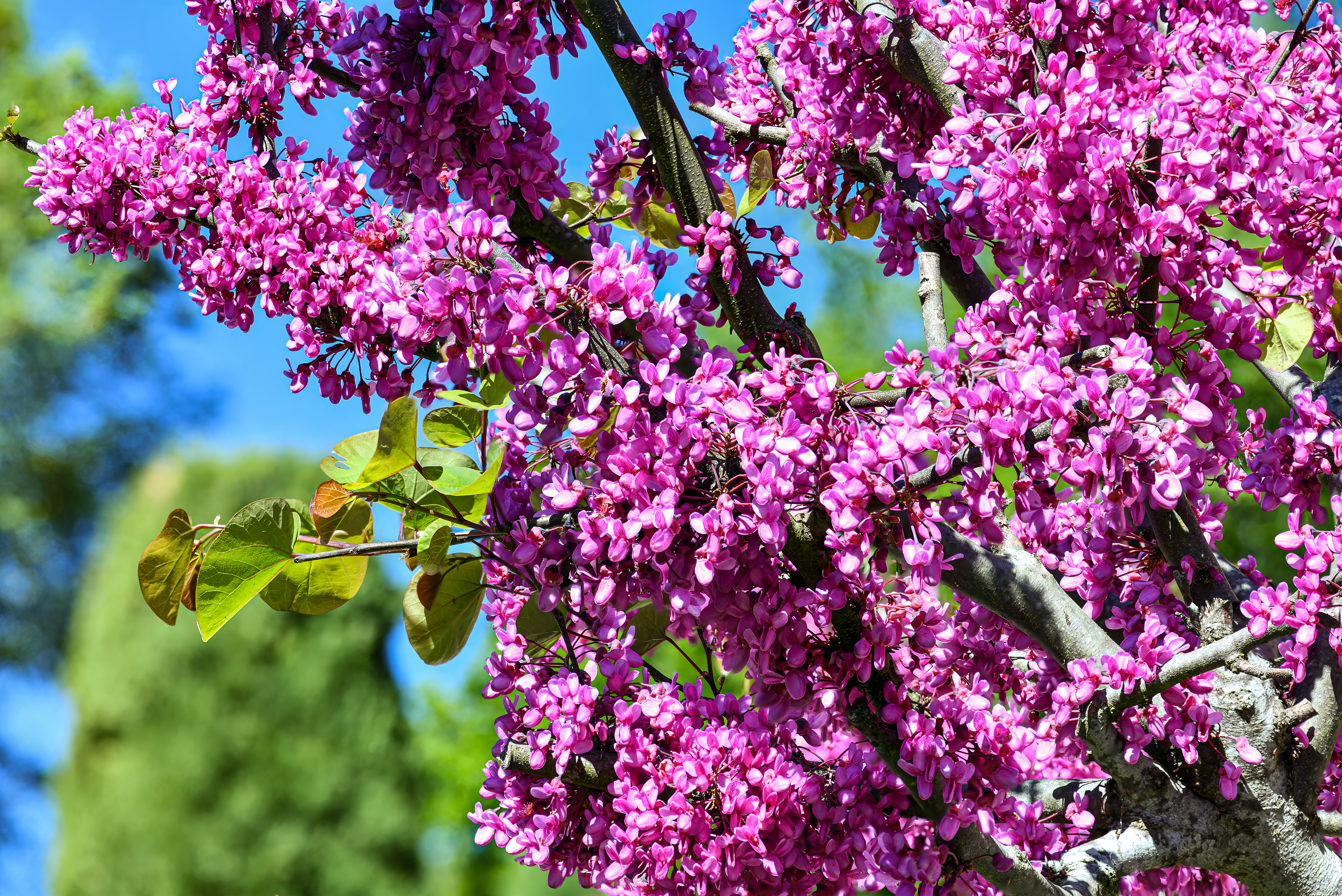
Cercis siliquastrum flowers on a mature branch

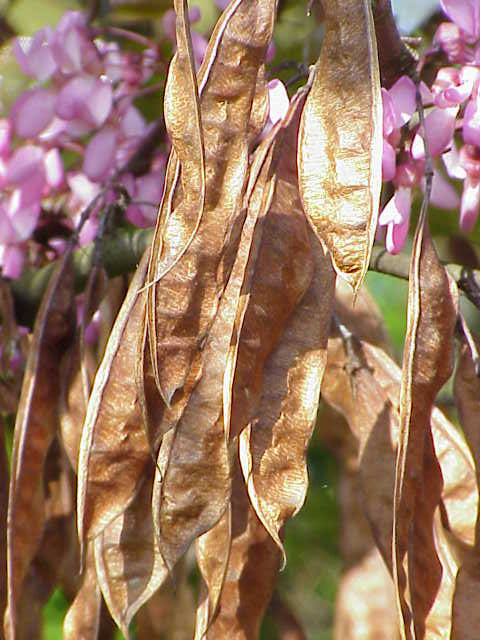
Cercis siliquastrum flowers and old seed pods

New redbud blossoms

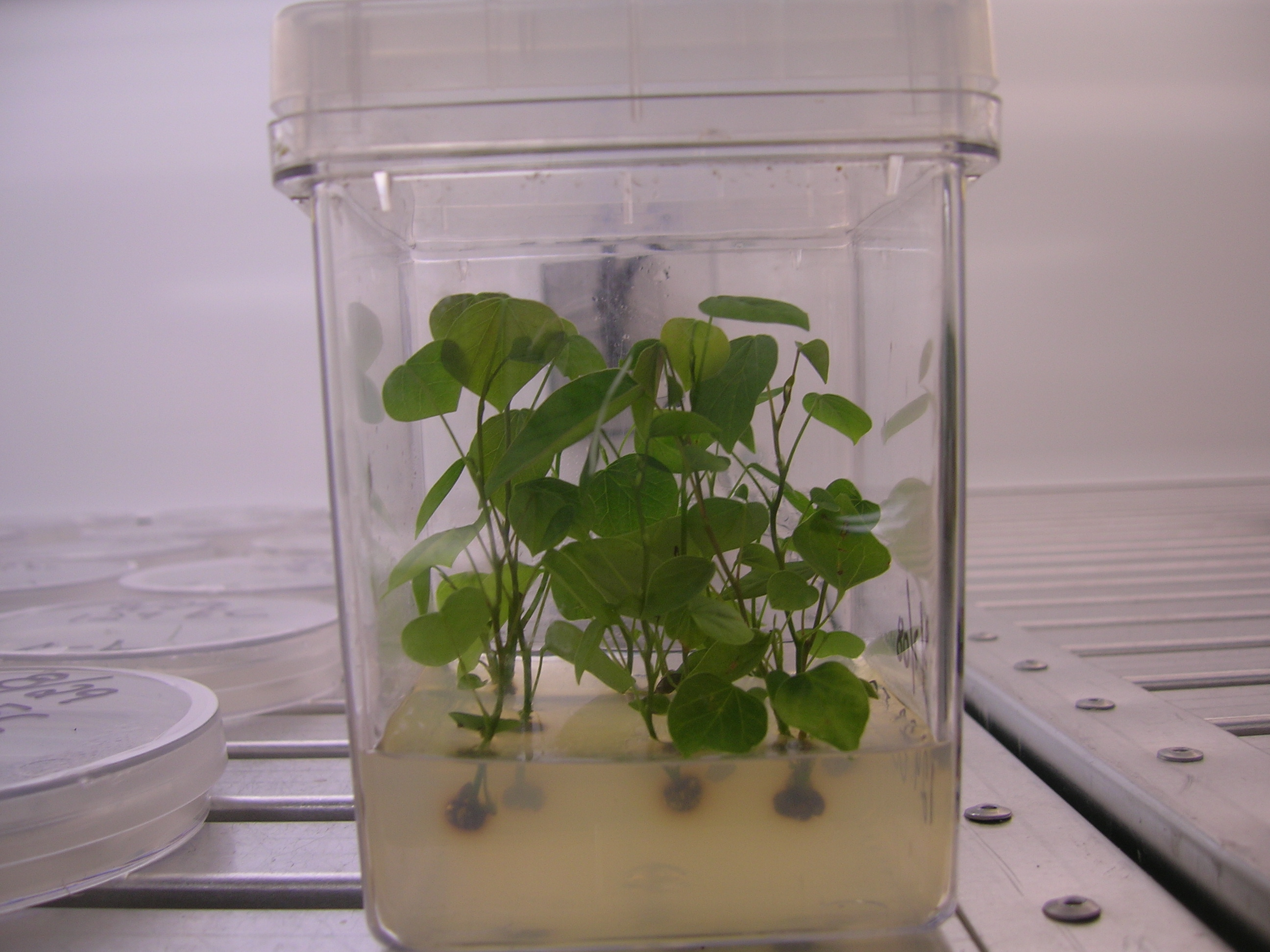
Cercis glabra in tissue culture

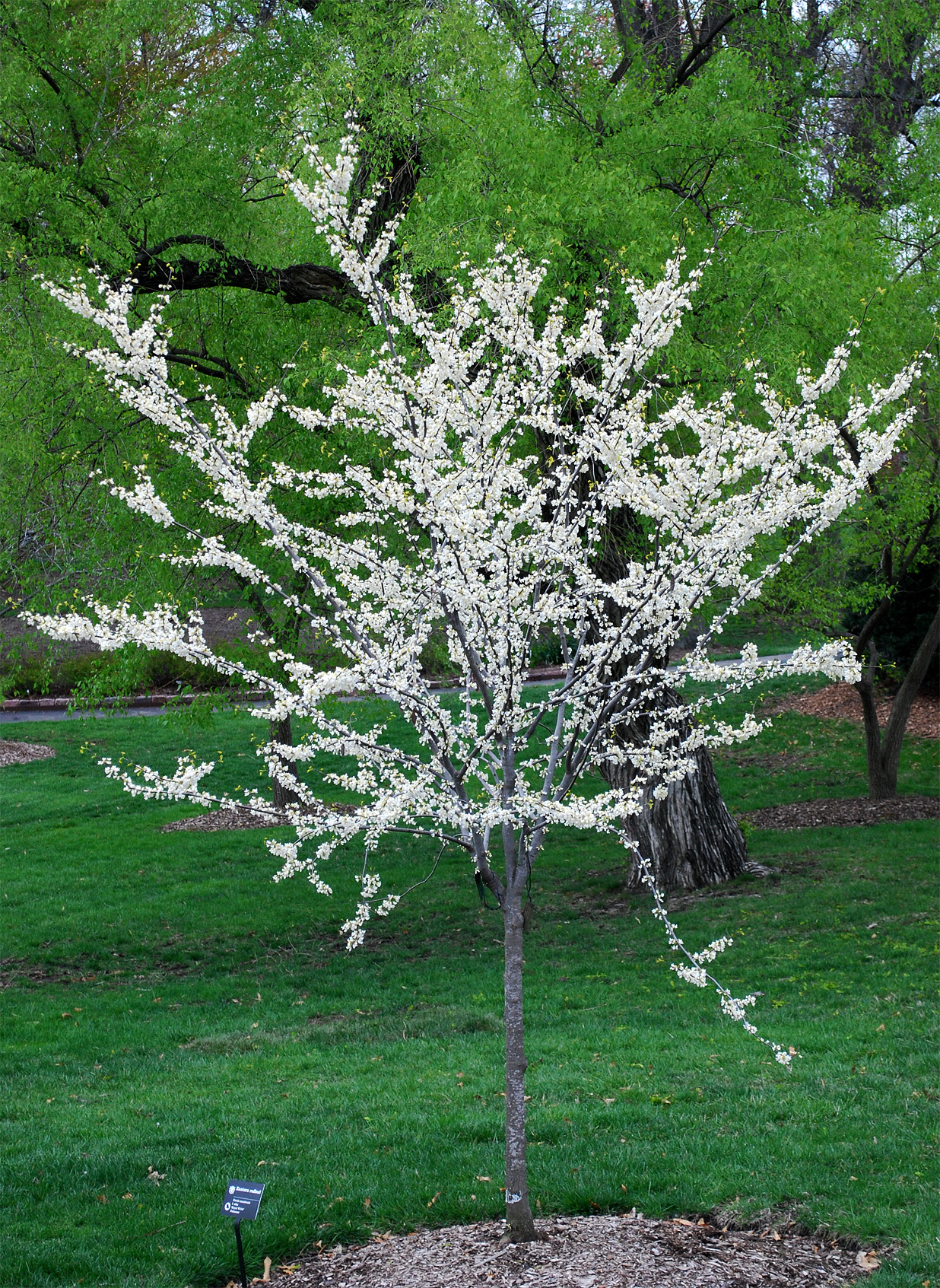
Eastern redbud or white redbud at Missouri Botanical Garden

Cercis sp. pollen shot on an SEM

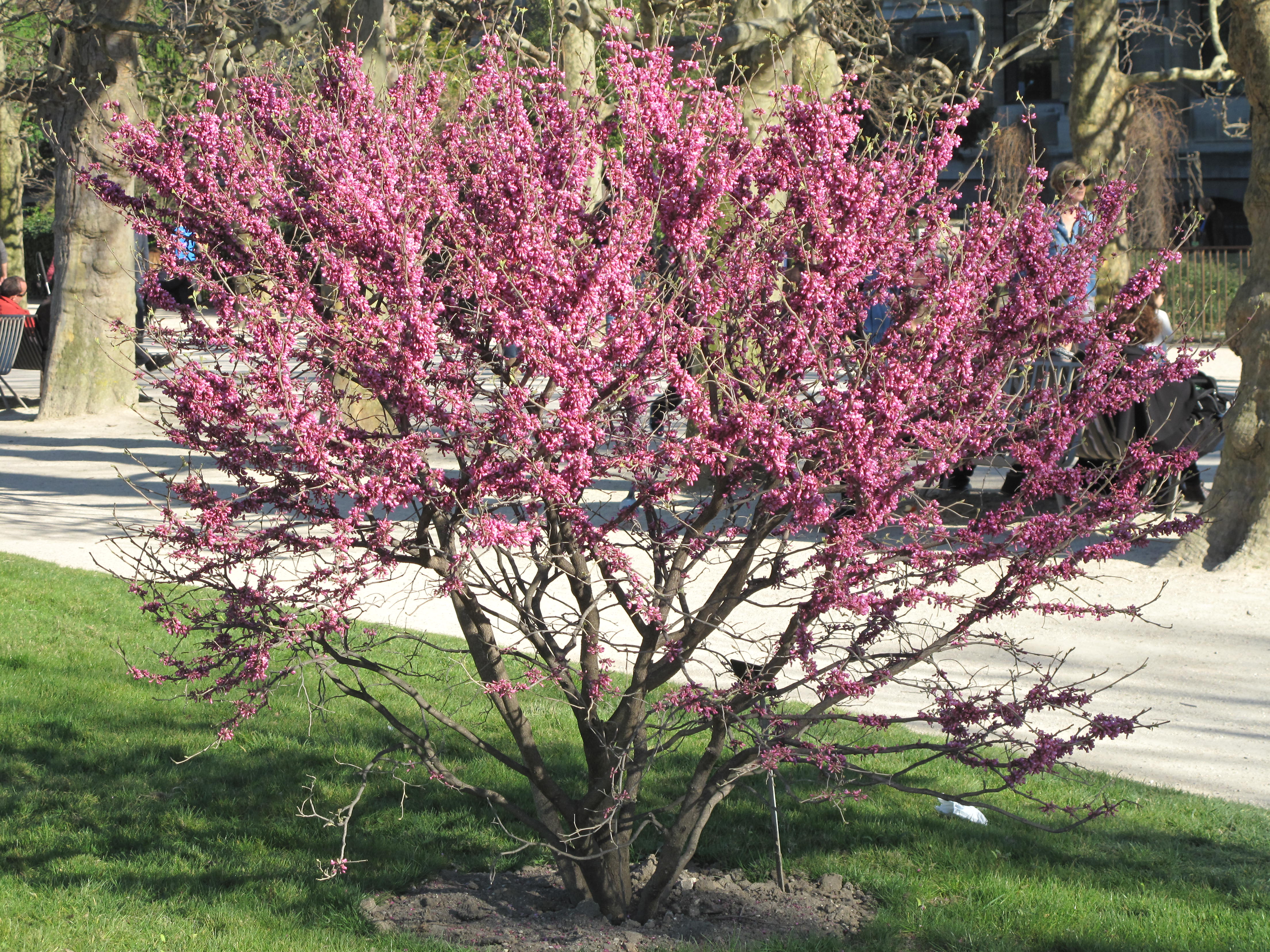
Cercis glabra
