= Cercis orbiculata =

Conservation status
- Data Deficient (IUCN 3.1)

Scientific classification
- Kingdom: Plantae
- Clade: Embryophytes
- Clade: Tracheophytes
- Clade: Spermatophytes
- Clade: Angiosperms
- Clade: Eudicots
- Clade: Rosids
- Order: Fabales
- Family: Fabaceae
- Genus: Cercis
- Species: C. orbiculata

Binomial name
- Cercis orbiculata Greene

Synonyms
- Cercis canadensis var. orbiculata (Greene) Barneby; Cercis occidentalis var. orbiculata (Greene) Tidestr.

Species of plant

Cercis orbiculata, the Arizona redbud, is a species of flowering plant in the family Fabaceae. It is native to the U.S. states of Nevada, Utah, and Arizona, and is particularly common in Grand Canyon National Park. A large shrub or small tree, it is typically found on slopes, canyons, and streambanks at elevations from 150 to 1,830 m (500 to 6,000 ft). Native Americans used its bark and wood for basketry and bow-making. Its showy flowers can be white, pink, purple, or red.
