= Victor King Chesnut =

American botanist and chemist (1867–1938)

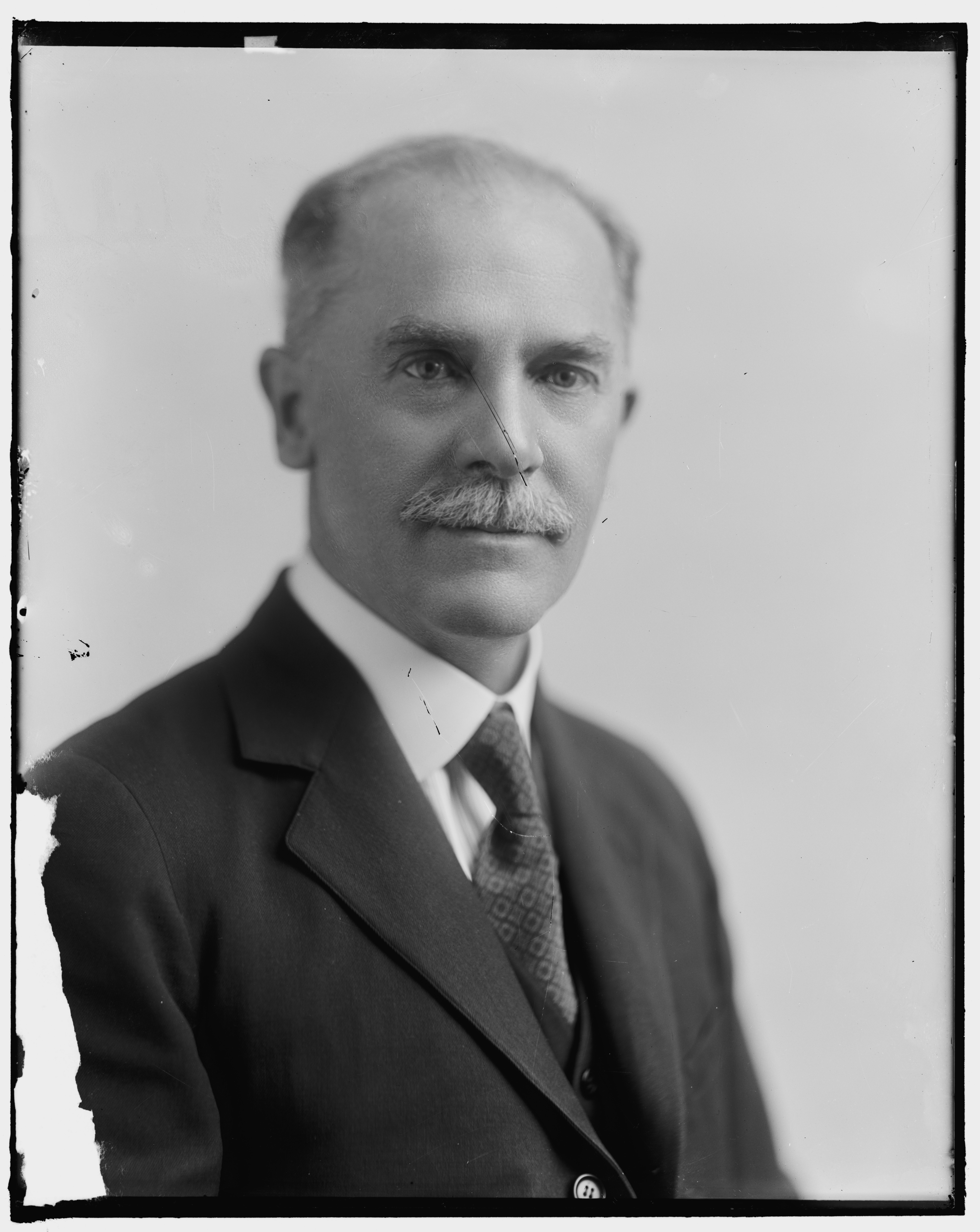
- Born: June 28, 1867; Nevada City, California
- Died: August 29, 1938 (aged 71)
- Education: University of California (B.S.)
- Known for: Plant toxicology
- Spouse: Olive Branch
- Children: George Spohr; Alma Etta; Frank T. Gertrude
- Parents: John Andrew Chesnut (father); Henrietta Sarah King (mother)
- Scientific career
- Fields: Botany and chemistry
- Workplaces: United States Department of Agriculture

Victor King Chesnut (June 28, 1867 – August 29, 1938) was an American botanist and chemist who pioneered the scientific study of poisonous plants in the United States.

== Biography ==
Chesnut was born in Nevada City, California on June 28, 1867, the son of John Andrew Chesnut and Henrietta Sarah King. After graduating from Oakland high school, he matriculated at the University of California. He was awarded a B.S. in 1890 and became a chemistry assistant at the same institution for three years. For a brief period, he studied at the University of Chicago, then was accepted as a botany assistant at the United States Department of Agriculture (USDA) in 1894. Initially, he was assistant to the chief in the department's office of botanical research. In November 1894, the department decided to undergo an investigation of poisonous plants, placing Chesnut in charge of this program.

In 1898, Chesnut was the author of Principal Poisonous Plants of the United States; a government report that was widely circulated and reprinted with illustrations. He was married to Olive Branch Spohr on July 18, 1899, at Berkeley, California. The couple would have four children: George Spohr (born 1900), Alma Etta (born 1902), Frank T. (born 1904), and Gertrude (born 1906). In 1901, he published a study titled The stock-poisoning plants of Montana in 1901, about the six species of plants that poisoned over 10,000 domestic animals in 1900. His Plants used by the Indians of Mendocino County, California was published in 1902. In 1904, he became a professor at the Montana College of Agriculture and Mechanical Arts, teaching chemistry and geology. During this time, he was a chemist at the Montana Experimental Station, and collaborated with the USDA on poisonous plant investigations.

On July 1, 1907, he became a chemistry assistant for the USDA's Drug Laboratory, relocating to the Washington D. C. area. During his career, Chesnut served as president for the Washington chapter of the American Chemical Society and vice president of the Washington Academy of Sciences. He retired from the USDA in 1933 and died on August 29, 1938.

== Bibliography ==
- Chesnut, V. K. (1897), Some common poisonous plants, US Department of Agriculture, Division of Botany.
- Chesnut, V. K. (1898), Principal Poisonous Plants of the United States, US Department of Agriculture, Division of Botany.
- Chesnut, V. K. (1898), Thirty poisonous plants of the United States (No. 86), US Department of Agriculture, Division of Botany.
- Chesnut, V. K.; Wilcox, E. V. (1901), The stock-poisoning plants of Montana, US Department of Agriculture, Division of Botany.
- Chesnut, V. K. (1901), Some poisonous plants of the northern stock ranges, US Department of Agriculture, Division of Botany, archived from the original on April 20, 2023.
- Chesnut, V. K. (1902), Plants used by the Indians of Mendocino County, California, US Department of Agriculture, Division of Botany.
- Chesnut, V. K. (1902), "Problems in the chemistry and toxicology of plant substances", Science, 15 (391): 1016–1028, Bibcode:1902Sci....15.1016C, doi:10.1126/science.15.391.1016, JSTOR 1627602.
