= Mountain devil =

Mountain devil may refer to:

- Lambertia formosa, a proteaceous shrub of the Sydney and Blue Mountains region in Australia
- Moloch horridus, a lizard of inland Australia
