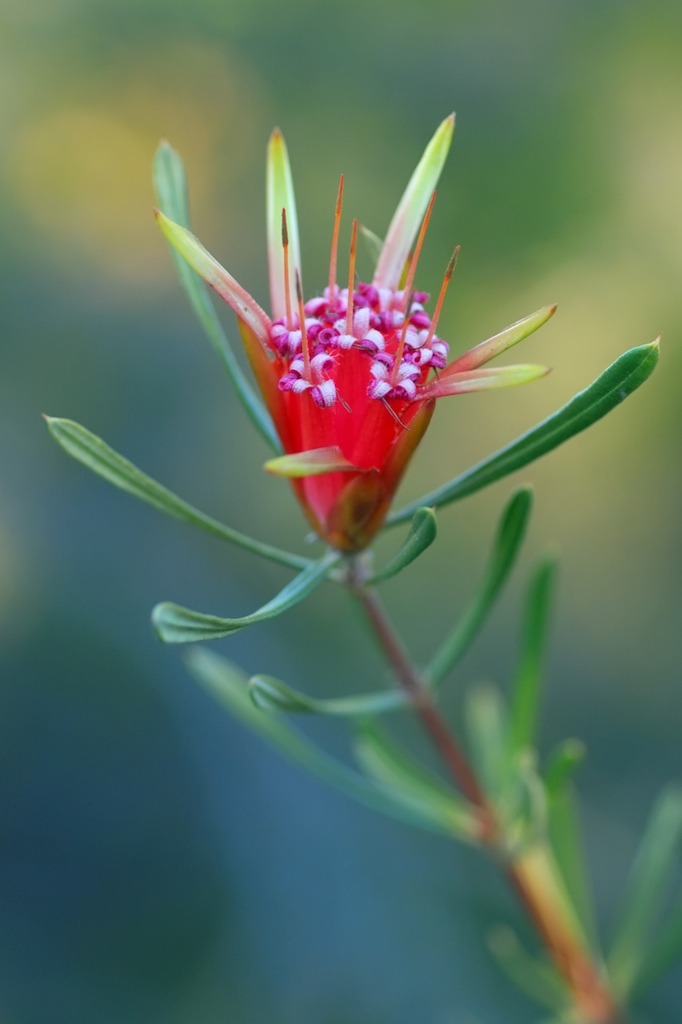

Scientific classification
- Kingdom: Plantae
- Clade: Tracheophytes
- Clade: Angiosperms
- Clade: Eudicots
- Order: Proteales
- Family: Proteaceae
- Genus: Lambertia
- Species: L. formosa

Binomial name
- Lambertia formosa Sm.
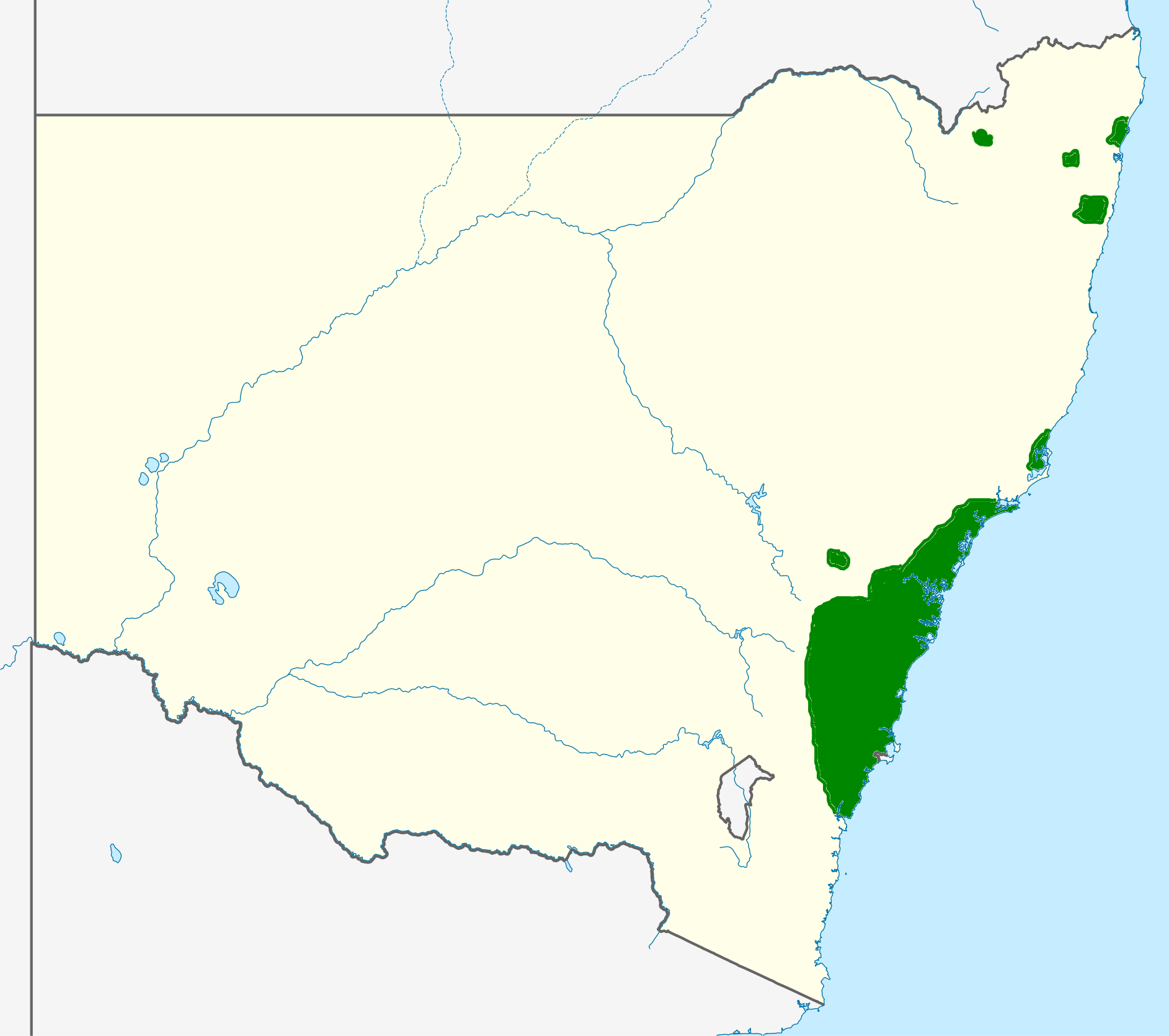
- Range of L. formosa

Synonyms
- Lambertia barbata Gand.; Lambertia proxima Gand.; Brabejum pungens Sol.

= Lambertia formosa =

Species of shrub endemic to New South Wales, Australia

Lambertia formosa, commonly known as mountain devil, is a shrub of the family Proteaceae, endemic to New South Wales, Australia. First described in 1798 by English botanist James Edward Smith, it is the type species of the small genus Lambertia. It is generally found in heathland or open forest, growing in sandstone-based soils. It grows as a multistemmed shrub to around 2 m (7 ft) with a woody base known as a lignotuber, from which it regrows after bushfire. It has stiff narrow leaves, and the pink to red flowerheads, made up of seven individual tubular flowers, generally appear in spring and summer. It gains its common name from the horned woody follicles, which were used to make small devil-figures.

The flowers hold profuse amounts of nectar and are pollinated by honeyeaters. Although L. formosa is uncommon in cultivation, it is straightforward to grow in soils with good drainage and a partly shaded to sunny aspect. It is readily propagated by seed. Unlike all other members of the genus Lambertia, L. formosa is greatly resistant to the soil pathogen Phytophthora cinnamomi.

== Taxonomy ==
Specimens of Lambertia formosa were collected by botanists Joseph Banks and Daniel Solander during Lieutenant James Cook's landing at Botany Bay between April and May in 1770. These are thought to have been obtained from vegetation currently known as the Eastern Suburbs Banksia Scrub that occurs in sandy areas near present-day La Perouse. Solander coined the (unpublished) binomial name Brabejum pungens in Banks' Florilegium. The shrub was first described in 1798 by English botanist James Edward Smith who concurrently erected the new genus Lambertia, the name honouring English botanist Aylmer Bourke Lambert. The specific name formosa is the Latin adjective for 'handsome'. English plantsman Henry Cranke Andrews wrote in 1799, "Of all the plants yet introduced from New Holland, that have hitherto flowered with us, this unquestionably takes the lead for beauty, considering the plant altogether", although his countryman Joseph Knight in his 1809 work On the cultivation of the plants belonging to the natural order of Proteeae added that the species name "applies only to the flowers, the foliage being generally of a sickly hue". French botanist Michel Gandoger described specimens collected at Hornsby and Port Jackson as Lambertia proxima, and material sent to him by plant collector Charles Walter as L. barbata in 1919; these turned out to be L. formosa. Gandoger described 212 taxa of Australian plants, almost all of which turned out to be species already described.

One of ten species of the genus Lambertia within the family Proteaceae, Lambertia formosa is the only one found in eastern Australia as the others are all restricted to southwest Western Australia. Common names include mountain devil and honey flower, the former from the fruit's resemblance to a devil's head. No subspecies are recognised, although plants in the southern part of its range from Bargo River to Braidwood have longer leaves.

== Description ==
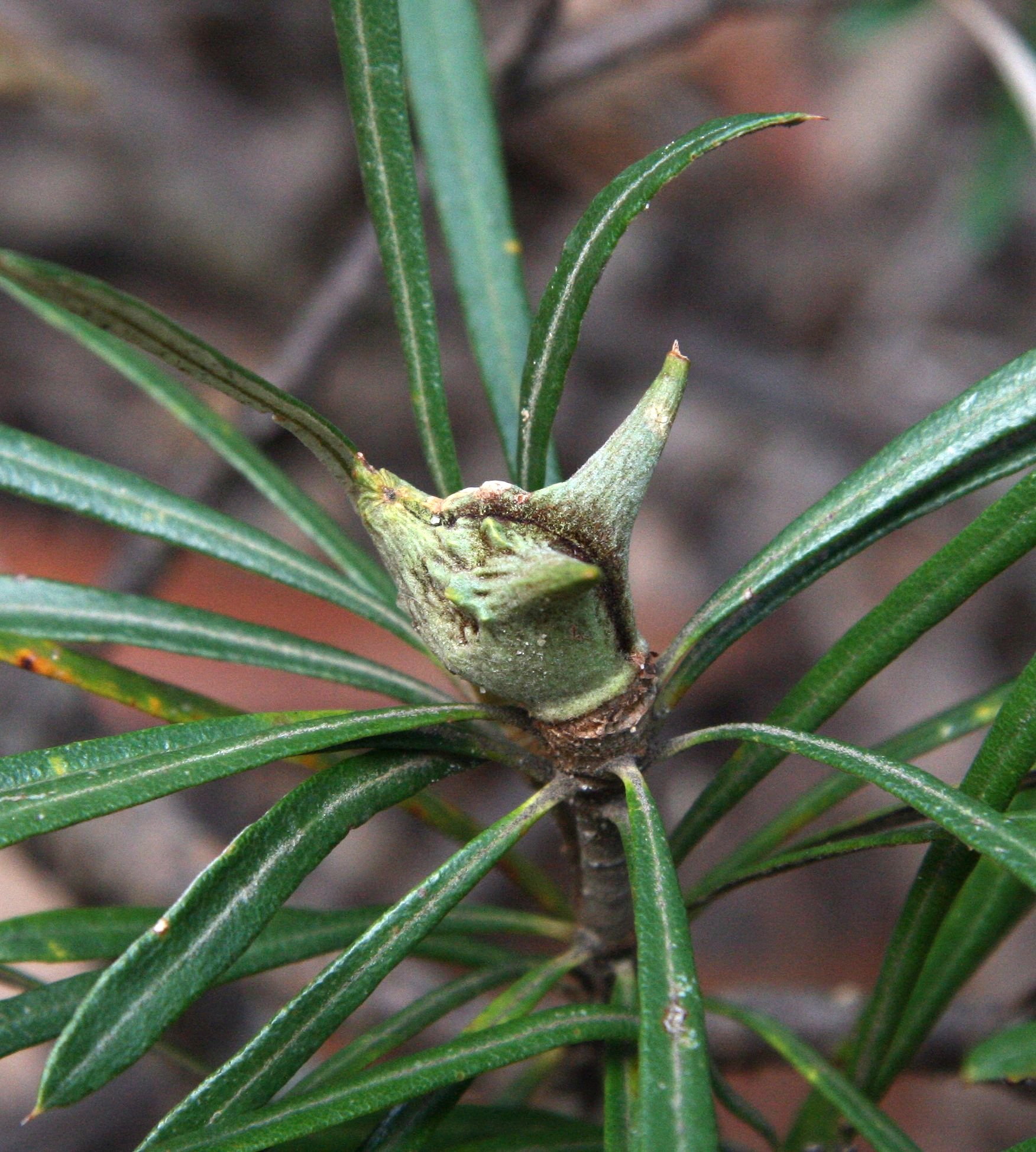
The developing fruit, from which the mountain devil gets its common name

Lambertia formosa grows as a spreading shrub to 2 m (7 ft) tall, with one or more stems arising from a woody base known as a lignotuber. The new growth is covered with a fine brownish hair. The stiff leaves are arranged in whorls of 3, or sometimes up to 4 to 6, on the stems, and are linear to narrow-oblanceolate in shape. Measuring anywhere from 1 to 8 cm (0.4–3 in) in length and 0.2–0.7 cm wide, they have a pointed tip or apex. Flowers are seen at any time of the year, but more often over spring and summer (September to January). Their bases are covered by greenish and reddish bracts. The inflorescences are almost always made up of seven smaller individual flowers (less than 1% of flowerheads have either six or eight flowers), known as florets, and can be shades of red or pink in colour. The tubular perianths are 4.5 cm (1.6 in) long, with the styles protruding another 1–1.5 cm (0.5 in) beyond. Flowering is followed by the development of woody fruit which measure 2–3 by 1–2 cm. They have two 1–1.5 cm sharp horny protuberances, and a 0.5 cm 'beak', initially pale green in colour before fading to a grey-brown. These woody follicles each have two flat, winged seeds that are retained until burnt by fire.

== Distribution and habitat ==
Endemic to New South Wales, Lambertia formosa is found on or east of the Great Dividing Range from the vicinity of Braidwood north to Port Stephens, as well as some parts of northern New South Wales around Grafton and between Red Rock and Yamba. In the Sydney Basin, it is found from altitudes of zero to 1100 m (3600 ft) above sea level, and in areas of rainfall from 800 to 1400 mm (32–55 in) annually.

Lambertia formosa grows in heathland, mallee shrubland and dry sclerophyll forest, predominantly found on sandy or rocky soils. Associated heathland species include dwarf apple (Angophora hispida), paperbark teatree (Leptospermum trinervium), rusty banksia (Banksia oblongifolia) and heath banksia (Banksia ericifolia), while woodland trees include silvertop ash (Eucalyptus sieberi), smooth-barked apple (Angophora costata), narrow-leaved apple (A. bakeri), red bloodwood (Corymbia gummifera), yellow bloodwood (C. eximia), scribbly gum (Eucalyptus sclerophylla), and Sydney peppermint (E. piperita). One heathland community located between Lake Munmorah and Redhead grows at least partly on clayey soils. Here, L. formosa grows under mallee forms of brown stringybark (Eucalyptus capitellata) and broad-leaved white mahogany (E. umbra) and alongside shrubby forms of prickly-leaved paperbark (Melaleuca nodosa), dagger hakea (Hakea teretifolia), scrub she-oak (Allocasuarina distyla), rusty banksia and swathes of kangaroo grass (Themeda triandra).

== Ecology ==
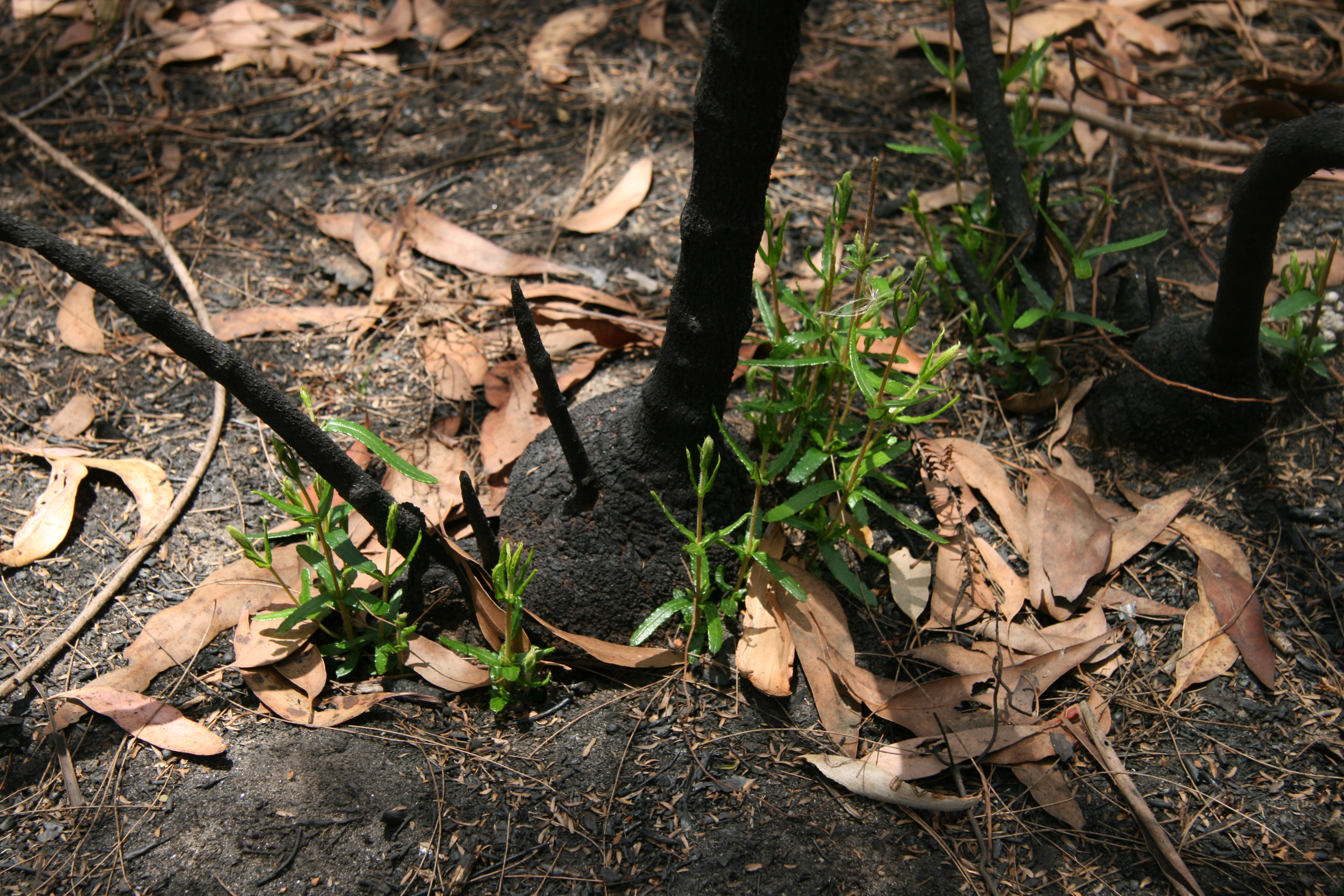
Resprouting from the woody base several months after a bushfire, Lane Cove National Park

Lambertia formosa regenerates after bushfire by resprouting from its woody lignotuber, but is also serotinous in that it has a seed bank held in its canopy to be released after fire. The number of flowers produced by plants growing back from fire peaks two or three years afterwards. A field study in Brisbane Water National Park north of Sydney found that plants that had experienced two short (less than seven-year) intervals between bushfires had reduced reproductive output as measured by lower numbers of follicles, compared with plants in areas which had had no or one short inter-fire interval. Plants can live for over 60 years.

The red/pink colour, length of the tube and properties of the nectar indicate that the flower is pollinated by honeyeaters, which perch as they consume the nectar. Species observed foraging include the white-eared honeyeater (Lichenostomus leucotis), white-cheeked honeyeater (Phylidonyris niger), New Holland honeyeater (Phylidonyris novaehollandiae), noisy miner (Manorina melanocephala), little wattlebird (Acanthochaera chrysoptera), eastern spinebill (Acanthorhynchus tenuirostris), and yellow-faced honeyeater (Lichenostomus chrysops). Honeyeaters are found in greater numbers in the vicinity of plants with more flowers.

Caterpillars of the Australian cup moth species Xylorycta strigata eat the leaves and make burrows in the wood. The plant also hosts caterpillars of the cup moth species Mecytha fasciata.

== Cultivation ==
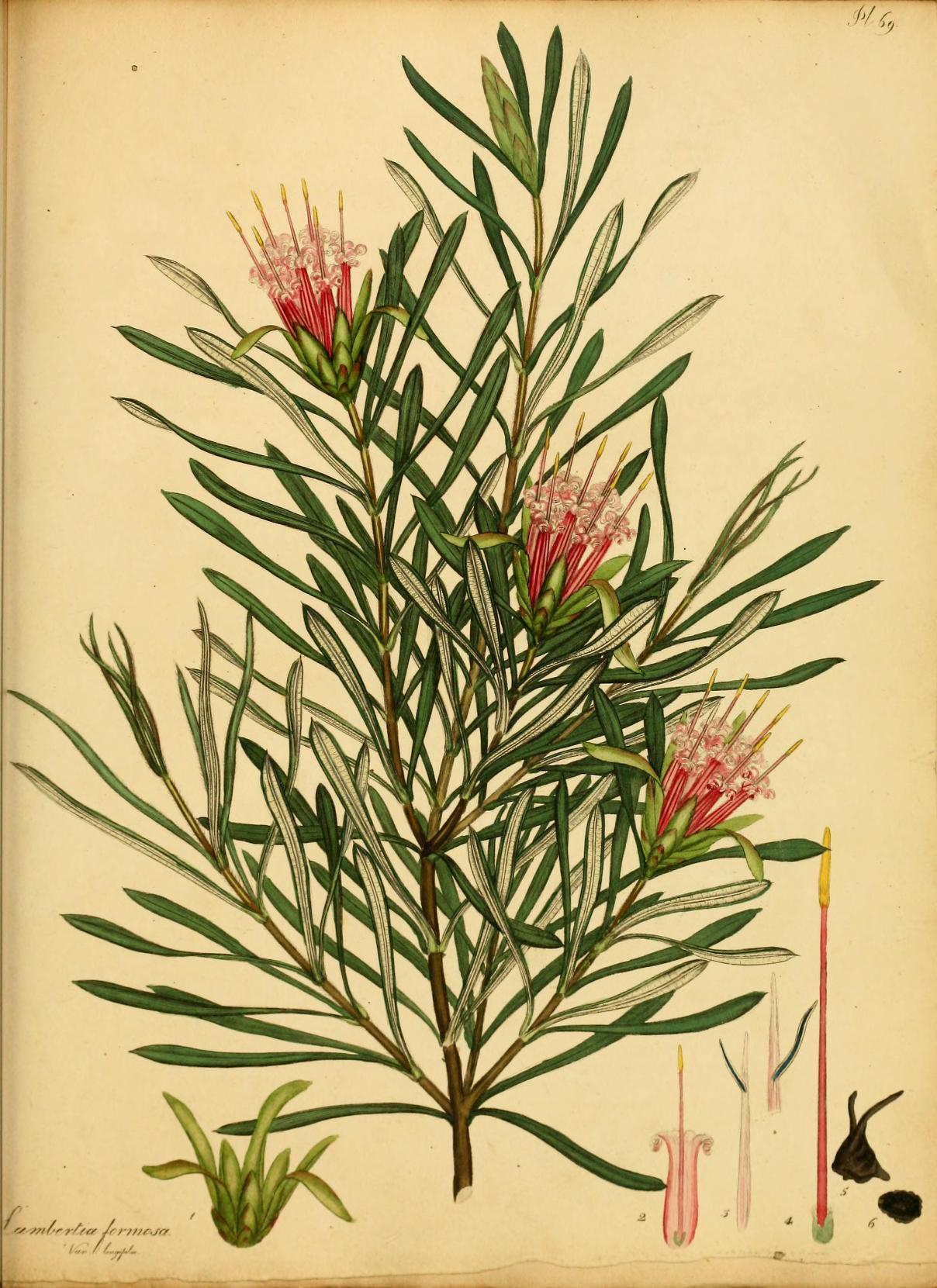
The leaves, flowers, and flower structure of the Australian plant Lambertia formosa. Illustration by Henry Cranke Andrews in 1797.

Lambertia formosa was one of the earliest introductions of Australian plant species to cultivation in England. In 1788, seed was sent from Botany Bay to the Lee and Kennedy's nursery in Hammersmith, west London. Two varieties were raised, one designated as "var. longifolia". The first recorded flowering was a plant grown by J. Robertson of Stockwell in July 1798. Andrews wrote the following year that it is "without difficulty raised by cuttings, and thrives in peat earth." Knight reported in 1809 that it required more heat and close care than other Australian plants and hence would never be widely cultivated in England.

Lambertia formosa is readily grown in cultivation given a sunny position and fair drainage, though it tolerates a range of soils and some shade. Its flowers attract birds, especially important as this can provide a source of food year-round. The plant responds well to pruning. Seeds germinate within 25 to 60 days of sowing, and firm young growth makes the best cutting material for propagation. Fertilisers generally are not needed, but slow release low-phosphorus fertilisers are tolerated. The species is frost-hardy and grows in temperate to subtropical climates.

Inoculation experiments show that Lambertia formosa is resistant to dieback (Phytophthora cinnamomi), unlike all other members of the genus. Hence it has potential as a rootstock for grafting Lambertia species of Western Australian origin, all of which are highly sensitive to root rot.

== Uses and cultural references ==
The common name "honey flower" is derived from the flowers which produce a clear nectar in large quantities. This was a source of nourishment for Australian Aboriginal Peoples and, following European colonisation, explorers, escaped convicts and children were recorded sucking the flowers. Explorer Ludwig Leichhardt wrote that "often when I've been tired and thirsty, I've bitten off the base of a tuft of Lambertia formosa flowers to suck the delightfully sweet honey out of them". Headaches and nausea have been reported from ingesting large quantities of the fluid, though it is not known to contain a toxic substance.

The species was the subject of an illustration by Sydney Parkinson, artist on HM Bark Endeavour's voyage to the Pacific from 1769 to 1771. A colour botanical engraving based on Parkinson's work is part of Banks' Florilegium. First Fleet midshipman and artist George Raper depicted the species in two works: an untitled watercolour study (c. 1788) and Bird Of Point Jackson (1789). Writer and illustrator George Collingridge incorporated the flower in several of his designs and unsuccessfully championed it as the floral emblem of Australia.

Hand-crafted figures have been made using the mature woody fruit for a head, together with pipe cleaners, wool and fabric scraps. Known as "mountain devils", these were sold as tourist souvenirs in the Blue Mountains.
