= Lambertia fairallii =

Scientific classification
- Kingdom: Plantae
- Clade: Tracheophytes
- Clade: Angiosperms
- Clade: Eudicots
- Order: Proteales
- Family: Proteaceae
- Genus: Lambertia
- Species: L. fairallii

Binomial name
- Lambertia fairallii Keighery

Species of shrub endemic to Western Australia

Lambertia fairallii, commonly known as Fairall's honeysuckle, is a shrub which is endemic to the south-west of Western Australia.

The species was formally described in 1983 by botanist Greg Keighery.

== Description ==
A description of L. fairallii is given in Florabase.
