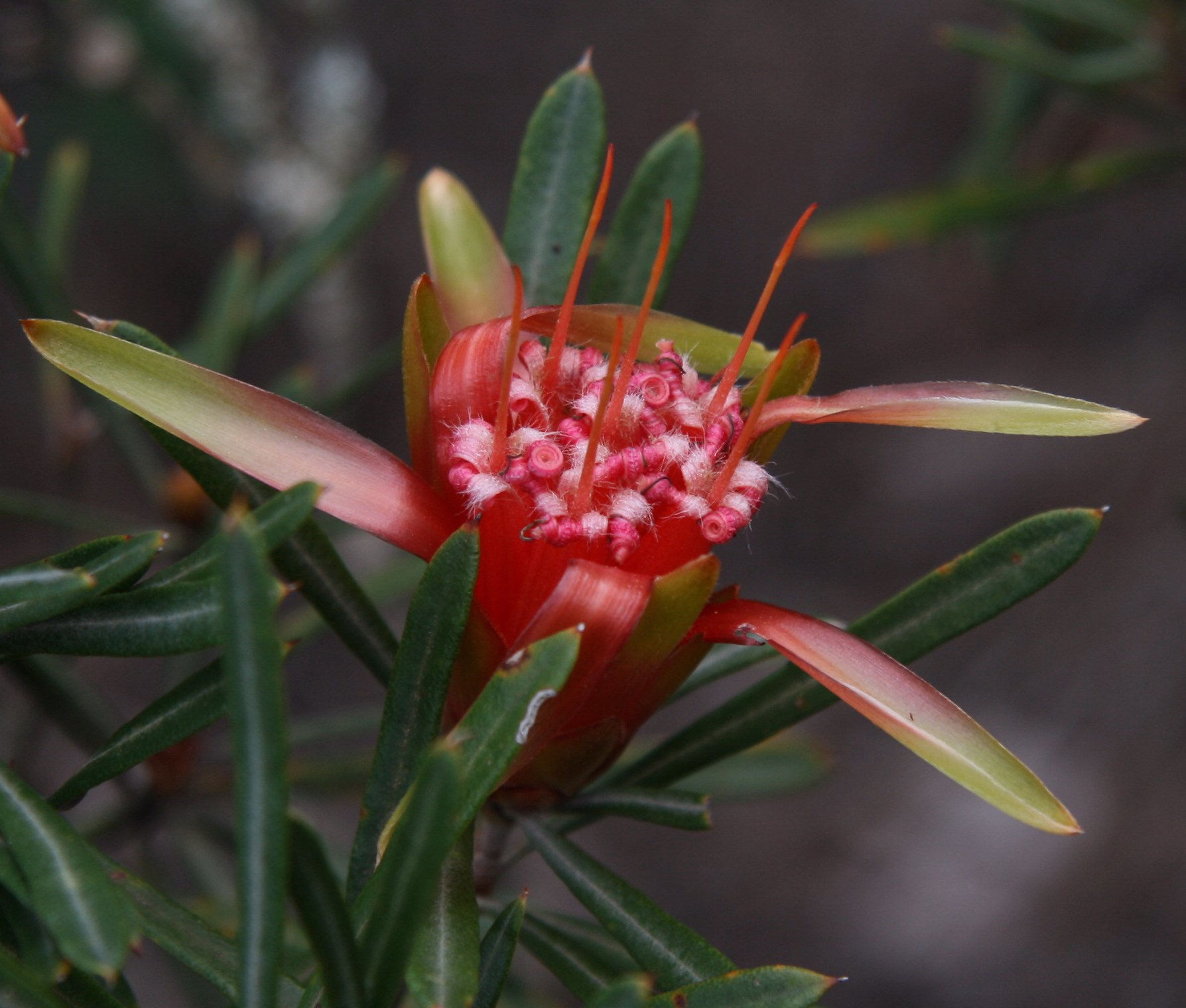
- Lambertia formosa

Scientific classification
- Kingdom: Plantae
- Clade: Tracheophytes
- Clade: Angiosperms
- Clade: Eudicots
- Order: Proteales
- Family: Proteaceae
- Subfamily: Grevilleoideae
- Tribe: Roupaleae
- Subtribe: Lambertiinae
- Genus: Lambertia; Sm.

Type species
- Lambertia formosa

Species
- See text

= Lambertia =

Genus of plants endemic to Australia

Lambertia is a genus of flowering plants, belonging to the family Proteaceae. It is endemic to Australia. The genus was named in 1798 by Sir James Edward Smith in honour of English botanist Aylmer Bourke Lambert.

The Lambertias are sclerophyllous shrubs or small trees. The common name, wild honeysuckle, is due to the flowers, which are asymmetrical with a long floral tube and tightly rolled lobes, in red, orange, yellow and green.

== Species ==
There are ten species currently accepted by the Australian Plant Census, nine of which are endemic to the South West of Western Australia and one, L. formosa, is found in the Central Coast, Blue Mountains and Southern Highlands regions of New South Wales.

== Conservation ==
As of the 2025-2 update, six Lambertia species are on the IUCN Red List of Threatened Species, with five of them being threatened with extinction. Two species (L. ilicifolia and L. inermis) are listed as vulnerable, two more (L. echinata and L. multiflora) are listed as endangered and one, L. fairallii is listed as critically endangered. The Environment Protection and Biodiversity Conservation Act 1999 also lists L. echinata subspecies citrina and occidentalis and L. orbifolia as endangered and L. fairallii as critically endangered.

Habitat destruction, increased bushfire frequencies and the pathogen which causes dieback disease, Phytophthora cinnamomi are the greatest threats to these species.

Common and scientific names	Subspecies and varieties	Distribution	IUCN Status	Other statuses	Image
Prickly honeysuckle, Lambertia echinata R.Br.	subsp. citrina Hnatiuk Prickly honeysuckle - subsp. echinata Western prickly honeysuckle - subsp. occidentalis Keighery	S.W. Western Australia		Endangered (subsp. citrina + occidentalis) (EPBC) Threatened (Declared Rare Flora) – Extant Taxa (subsp. citrina + occidentalis (DEC)	
Heath-leaved honeysuckle Lambertia ericifolia R.Br.		S.W. Western Australia			
Fairall's lambertia, Fairall's honeysuckle Lambertia fairallii Keighery		SW. Western Australia		Critically Endangered (EPBC) Threatened (Declared Rare Flora) – Extant Taxa (DEC)	
Mountain devil, honey flower Lambertia formosa Sm.		Northern NSW around Grafton and between Red Rock and Yamba and Central Coast to Blue Mountains and Southern Highlands in southern NSW.			
Holly-leaved honeysuckle Lambertia ilicifolia Hook.		S.W. Western Australia			
Chittick Lambertia inermis R.Br.	var. drummondii (Fielding & Gardner) Hnatiuk var. inermis	S.W. Western Australia			
Many-flowered honeysuckle Lambertia multiflora Lindl.	var. darlingensis Hnatiuk var. multiflora	S.W. Western Australia			
Round-leaf honeysuckle Lambertia orbifolia C.A.Gardner	Round-leaf honeysuckle - subsp. orbifolia Penny-leaved honeysuckle - subsp. pecuniosa A.D.Webb, L.T.Monks & Wege Scott River honeysuckle - subsp. vespera A.D.Webb, L.T.Monks & Wege	S.W. Western Australia		Endangered (EPBC) Threatened (Declared Rare Flora) – Extant Taxa (All subsp.) (DEC)	
Green honeysuckle Lambertia rariflora Meisn.	subsp. lutea Hnatiuk subsp. rariflora	S.W. Western Australia			
Lambertia uniflora R.Br.		S.W. corner of Western Australia			
