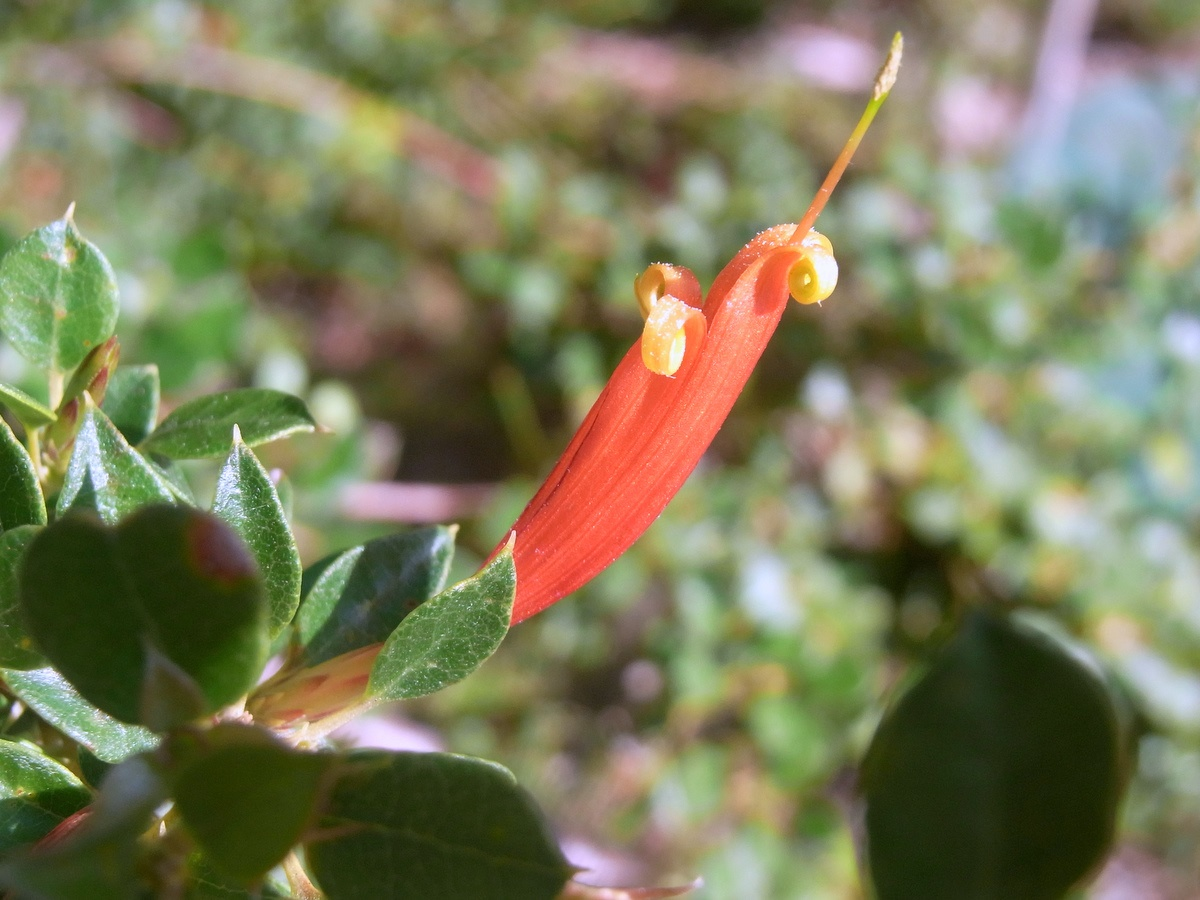

Scientific classification
- Kingdom: Plantae
- Clade: Tracheophytes
- Clade: Angiosperms
- Clade: Eudicots
- Order: Proteales
- Family: Proteaceae
- Genus: Lambertia
- Species: L. uniflora

Binomial name
- Lambertia uniflora R.Br.

= Lambertia uniflora =

Shrub endemic to Western Australia

Lambertia uniflora is a shrub in the family Proteaceae. Endemic to the moist south-west corner of Western Australia, it grows to about 3 metres in height. The shrub's single axillary or terminal flowers appear between October and January in the species' native range. These flowers are orange or red in color with a yellow or yellow-green limb. This species first appeared in the scientific literature in 1810, authored by the prolific Scottish botanist, Robert Brown.
