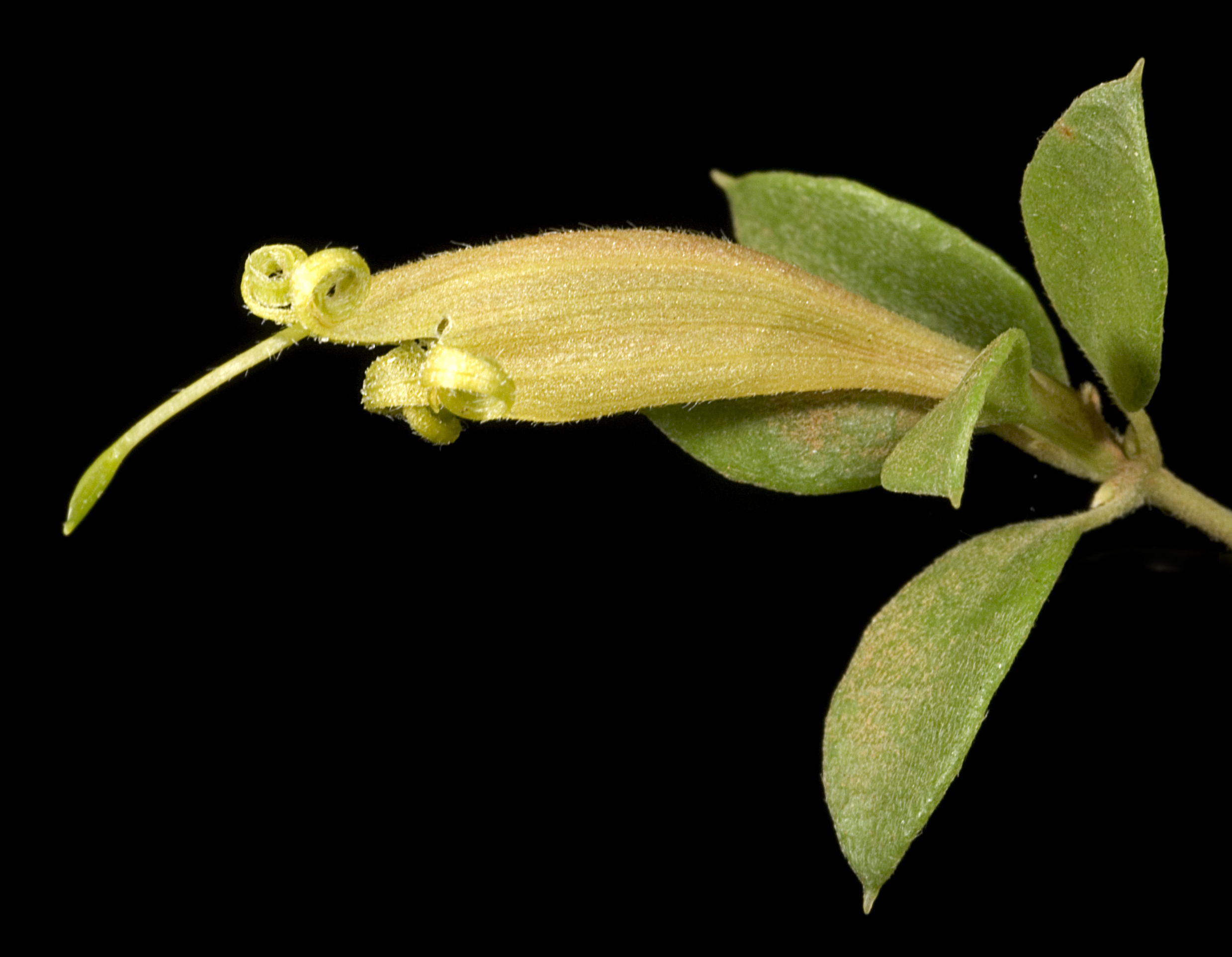

Scientific classification
- Kingdom: Plantae
- Clade: Tracheophytes
- Clade: Angiosperms
- Clade: Eudicots
- Order: Proteales
- Family: Proteaceae
- Genus: Lambertia
- Species: L. rariflora

Binomial name
- Lambertia rariflora Meisn.

= Lambertia rariflora =

Species of shrub endemic to Western Australia

Lambertia rariflora, commonly known as green honeysuckle, is a shrub which is endemic to the south-west of Western Australia.

The species was formally described in 1848 by botanist Carl Meisner.
