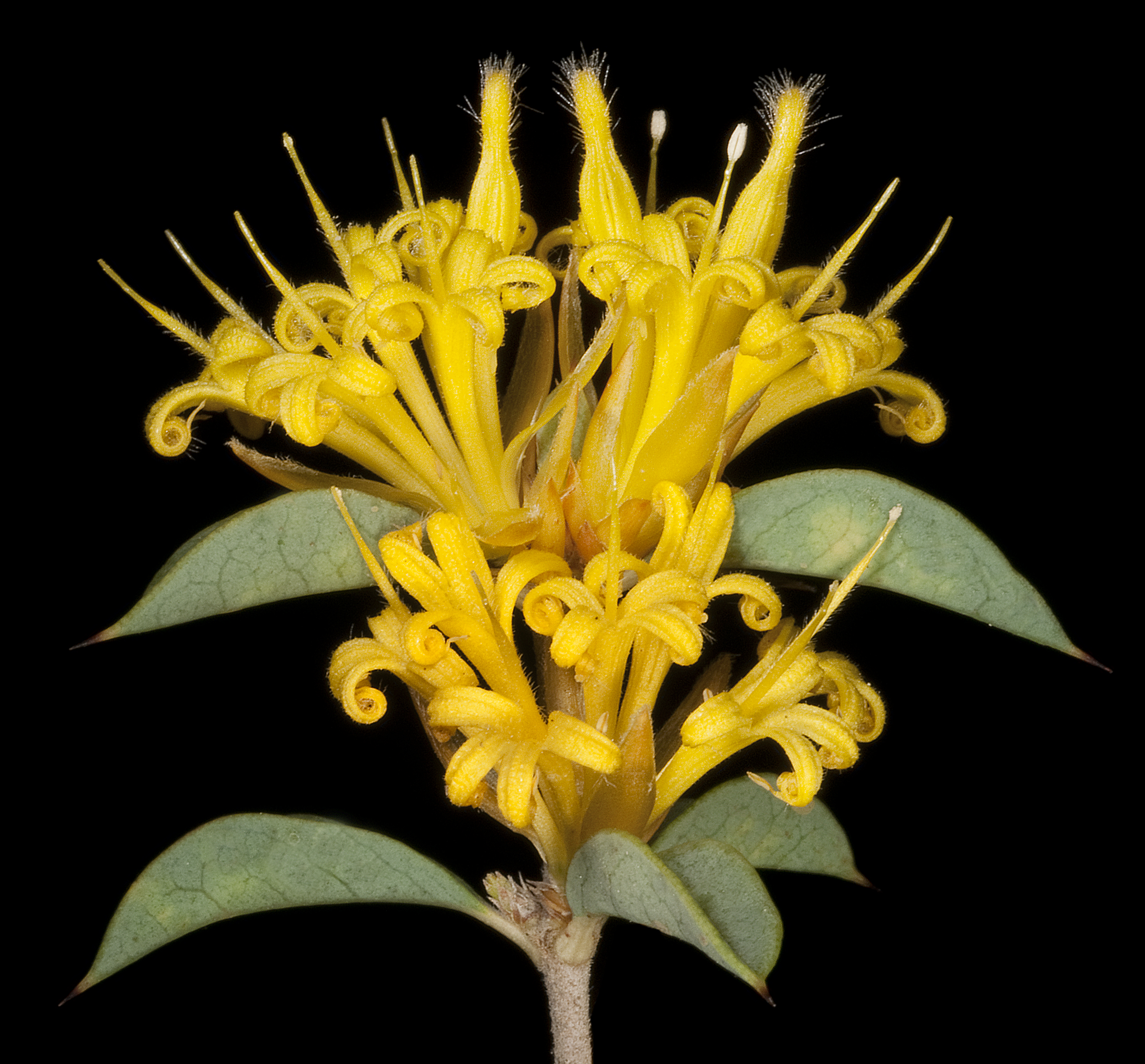

Scientific classification
- Kingdom: Plantae
- Clade: Tracheophytes
- Clade: Angiosperms
- Clade: Eudicots
- Order: Proteales
- Family: Proteaceae
- Genus: Lambertia
- Species: L. ilicifolia

Binomial name
- Lambertia ilicifolia Hook

= Lambertia ilicifolia =

Species of shrub endemic to Western Australia

Lambertia ilicifolia, commonly known as the holly-leaved honeysuckle, is a shrub which is endemic to south-west Western Australia.
