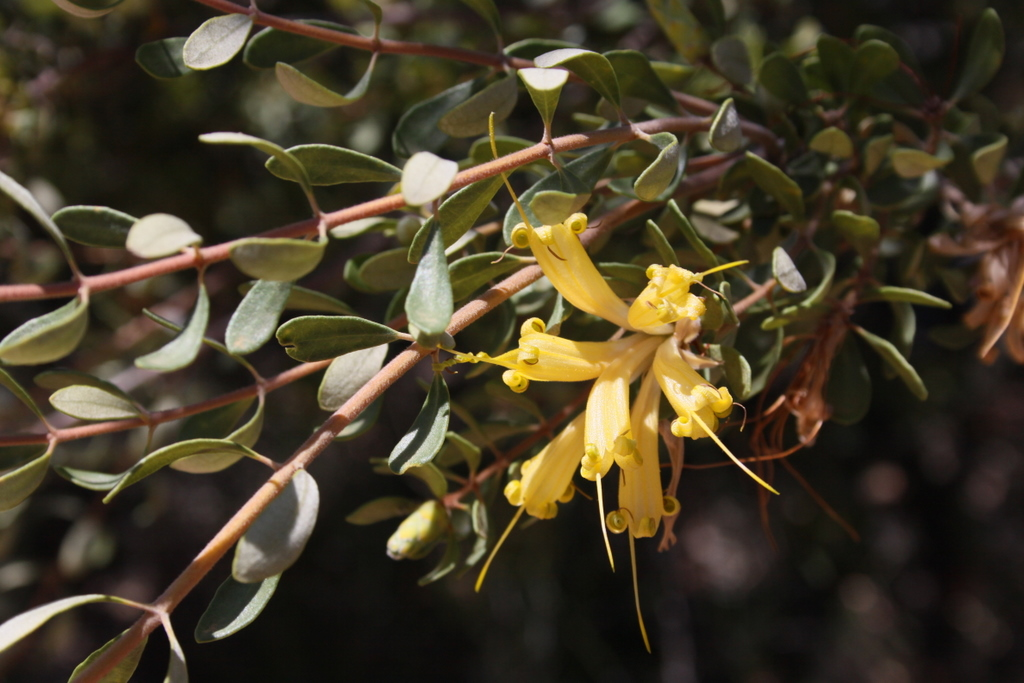
- Lambertia inermis var. drummondii

Scientific classification
- Kingdom: Plantae
- Clade: Tracheophytes
- Clade: Angiosperms
- Clade: Eudicots
- Order: Proteales
- Family: Proteaceae
- Genus: Lambertia
- Species: L. inermis

Binomial name
- Lambertia inermis R.Br.

Varieties
- L. inermis var. drummondii L. inermis var. inermis

= Lambertia inermis =

Species of shrub endemic to Western Australia

Lambertia inermis, the Noongar chittick, is a species of flowering plant in the family Proteaceae. It is endemic to south-west Western Australia. It is a shrub that grows to 6 metres (20 ft) high and flowers from spring to winter.

There are two varieties:

- Lambertia inermis var. drummondii (Fielding & Gardner) Hnatiuk – with yellow flowers
- Lambertia inermis R.Br. var. inermis – with orange-red flowers

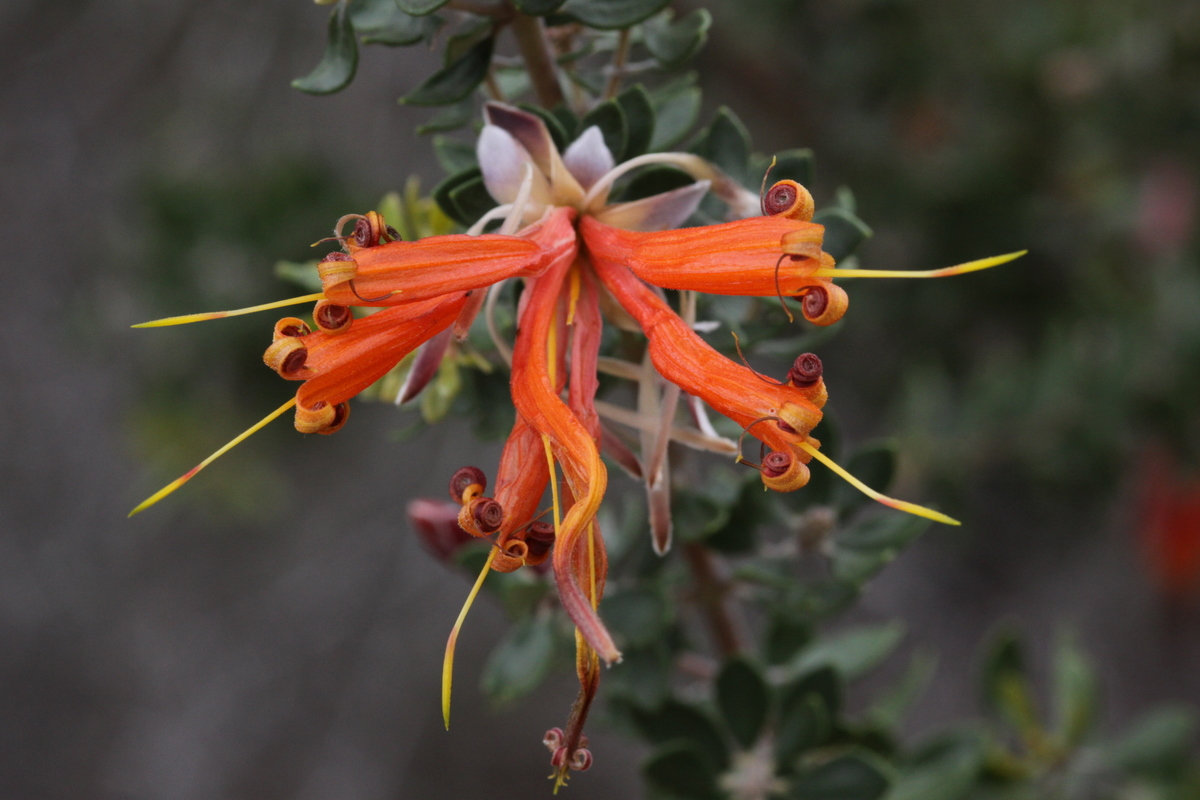
Lambertia inermis var. inermis at Yarrabee Reserve, Western Australia

== Distribution and habitat ==
Chittick grows near the south coast of Western Australia from west of Albany through to around Esperance, extending between 50 and 200 km (31 and 124 mi) inland from the coast. It grows on a variety of soils from sand to gravel.
