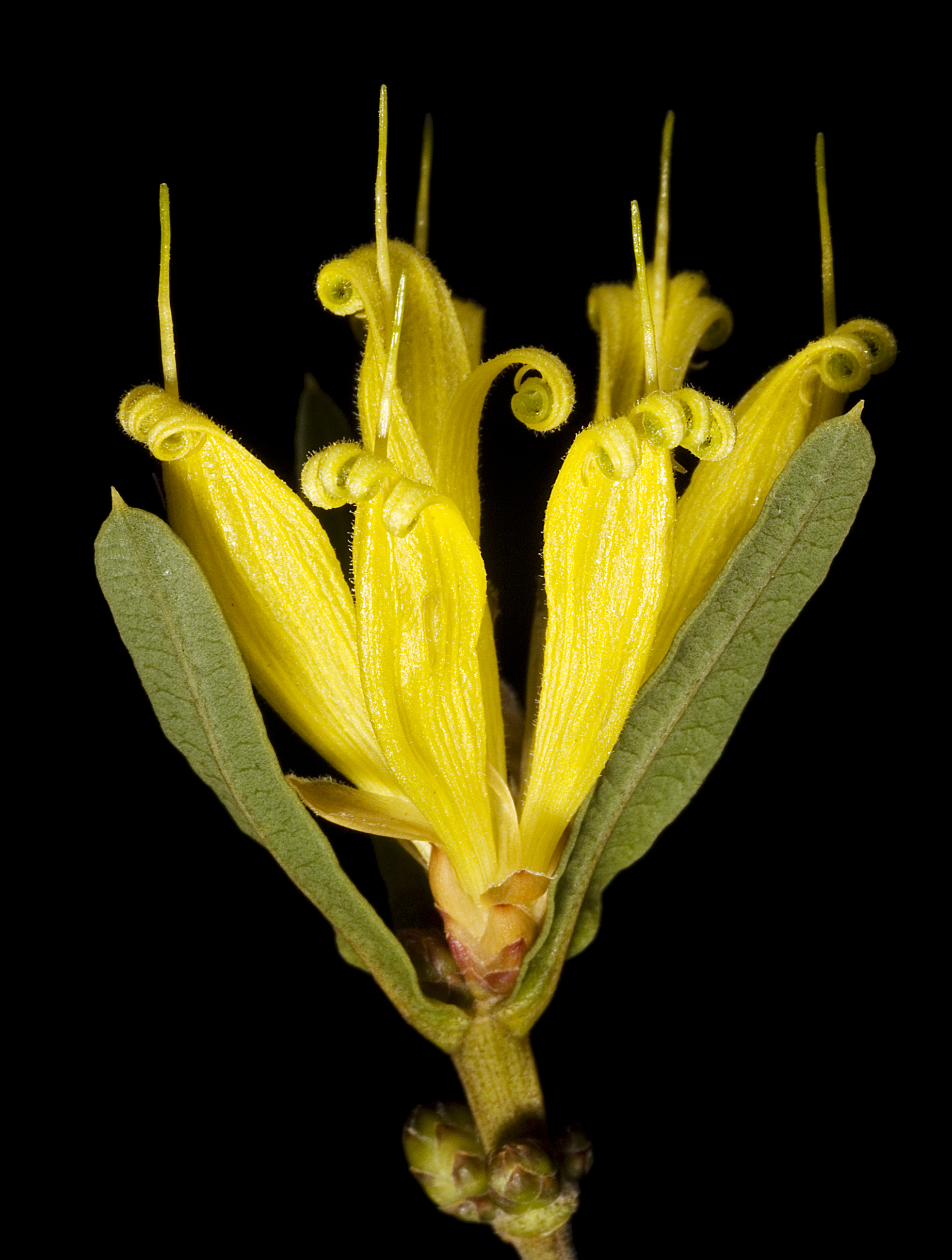

Scientific classification
- Kingdom: Plantae
- Clade: Tracheophytes
- Clade: Angiosperms
- Clade: Eudicots
- Order: Proteales
- Family: Proteaceae
- Genus: Lambertia
- Species: L. multiflora

Binomial name
- Lambertia multiflora Lindl.

= Lambertia multiflora =

Species of shrub endemic to Western Australia

Lambertia multiflora, commonly known as many-flowered honeysuckle, is a multi-stemmed shrub which is endemic to the south-west of Western Australia. It grows to between 0.5 and 2.5 metres (1 ft 8 in and 8 ft 2 in) high and flowers from winter to summer.

There are two varieties:

- Lambertia multiflora var. darlingiensis Hnatiuk – with yellow flowers
- Lambertia multiflora var. mutiflora – with orange-red flowers
