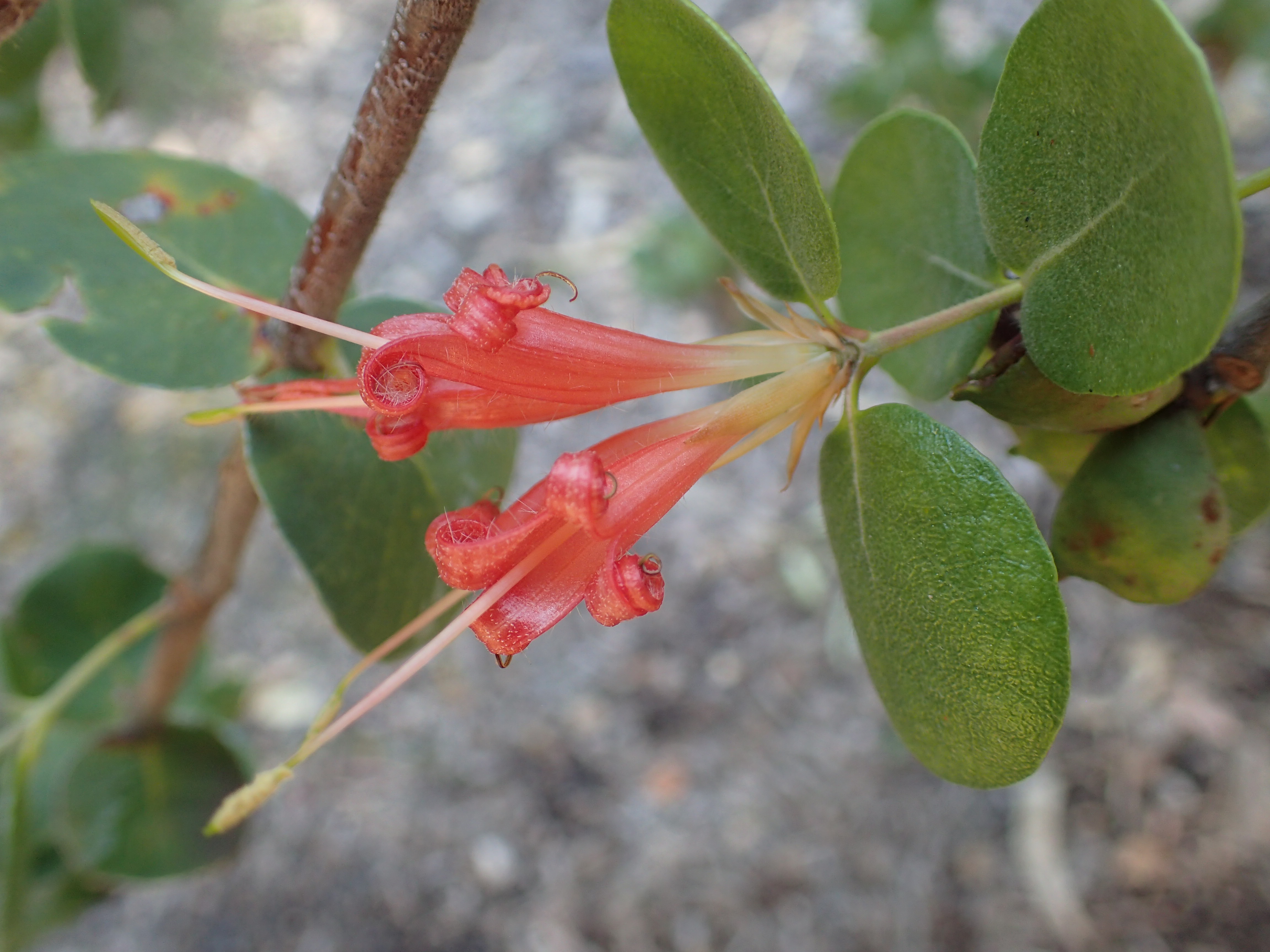
- In Kings Park, Perth

Conservation status
- Endangered (EPBC Act)

Scientific classification
- Kingdom: Plantae
- Clade: Tracheophytes
- Clade: Angiosperms
- Clade: Eudicots
- Order: Proteales
- Family: Proteaceae
- Genus: Lambertia
- Species: L. orbifolia

Binomial name
- Lambertia orbifolia C.A.Gardner

= Lambertia orbifolia =

Roundleaf honeysuckle

Species of plant endemic to Western Australia

Lambertia orbifolia, commonly known as the roundleaf honeysuckle, is a shrub or small tree that is endemic to the south-west of Western Australia. It has more or less circular leaves and groups of between four and six orange-red flowers.

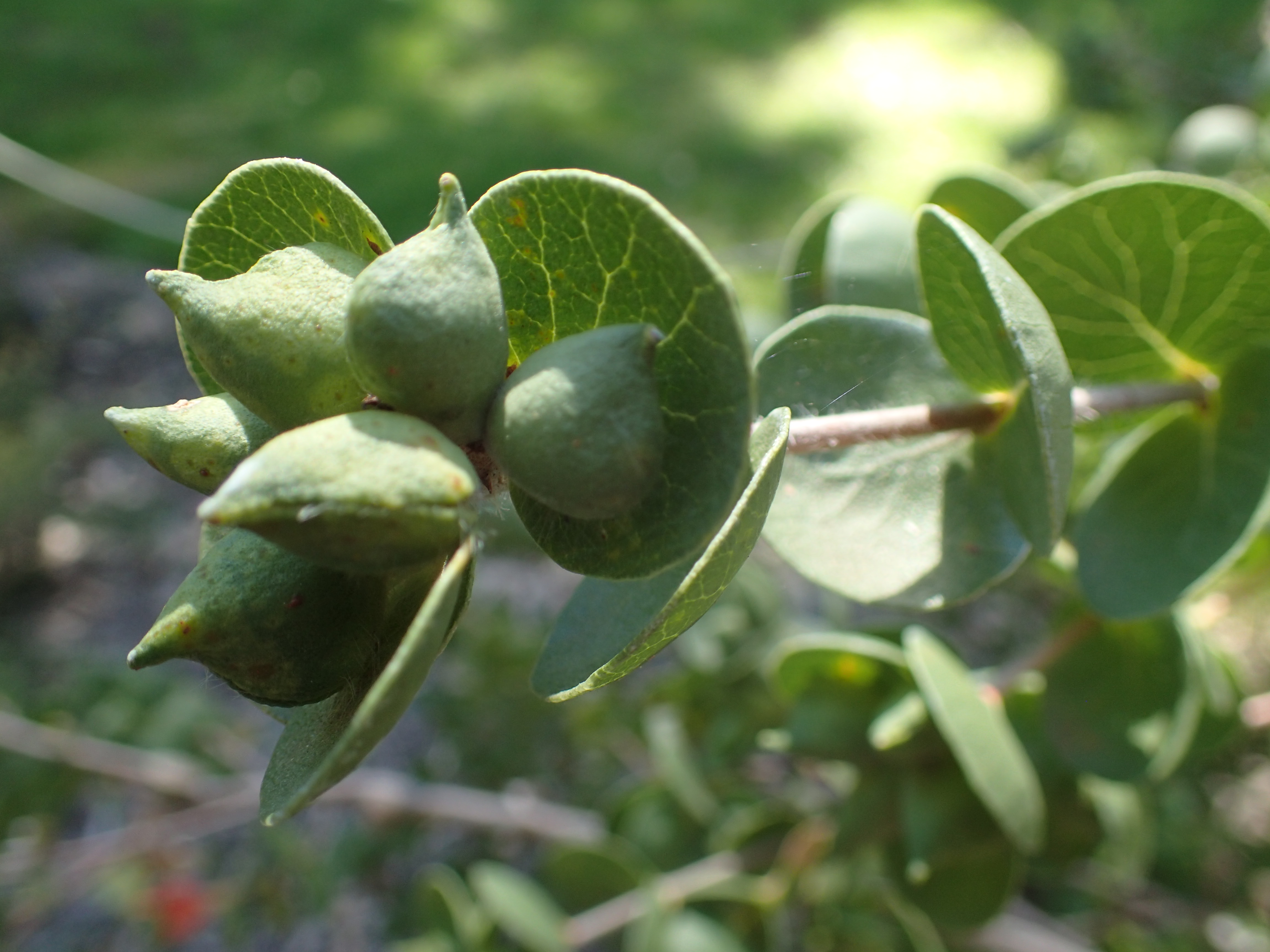
Fruit

== Description ==
Lambertia orbifolia is a shrub or small tree that grows to a height of up to 5 m (16 ft) but does not form a lignotuber. It has erect, spreading branches covered with soft hairs. The leaves are arranged in opposite pairs, sometimes in whorls of three and are 15–20 mm (0.59–0.79 in) in diameter and sessile. The flowers are arranged in groups of between four and six, each flower 40–60 mm (1.6–2.4 in) long with overlapping bracts at the base. The flowers are orange-red and tube-shaped with hairs on the inside. Flowering occurs throughout the year but peaks between November and May. The fruit is a woody capsule 7–10 mm (0.28–0.39 in) in diameter with a short beak.

== Taxonomy ==
Lambertia orbifolia was first formally described in 1964 by Western Australian State Botanist Charles Gardner from a specimen collected at the Scott River by Alfred John Gray in January 1945. The description was published in the Journal of the Royal Society of Western Australia. The specific epithet (orbifolia) is from the Latin words orbis meaning "anything circular" and -folius meaning "-leaved".

Three subspecies of L. orbifolia have been described in the journal Nuytsia in a 2023 genetic analysis of existing scattered populations, and the names are accepted by the Western Australian Herbarium and Plants of the World Online:

- Lambertia orbifolia C.A.Gardner subsp. orbifolia has strongly recurved, densely hairy bracts, the inner bracts 12–20 mm (0.47–0.79 in) long.
- Lambertia orbifolia subsp. pecuniosa A.D.Webb, L.T.Monks & Wege (commonly known as penny-leaved honeysuckle) has erect or recurved bracts that are densely hairy on both surfaces, the inner bracts 15–23 mm (0.59–0.91 in) long.
- Lambertia orbifolia subsp. vespera A.D.Webb, L.T.Monks & Wege (commonly known as Scott River honeysuckle) usually has erect bracts, the inner bracts 18–28 mm (0.71–1.10 in) long.

== Distribution and habitat ==
Roundleaf honeysuckle is known from two main areas, corresponding to the two proposed subspecies. Subspecies orbifolia occurs in the Narrikup area where it grows with jarrah and marri in banksia woodland, and subspecies vespera grows in dense shrubland and heathland in the Scott River Plains.

== Ecology ==
Lambertia orbifolia is killed by fire and regenerates from seed shortly after the fire, but few germinate in the interfire period. The species is susceptible to Phytophthora cinnamomi infection. The main pollinator of the species is thought to be the New Holland honeyeater (Phylidonyris novaehollandiae).

== Conservation ==
Lambertia orbifolia is listed as "not threatened" by the Western Australian Government Department of Biodiversity, Conservation and Attractions but is listed as "endangered" under the Australian Government Environment Protection and Biodiversity Conservation Act 1999. The main threats to the species are infection by P. cinnamomi, road and track maintenance and changes in hydrology. Both proposed subspecies of this plant are listed as "Threatened Flora (Declared Rare Flora — Extant)" by the Department of Environment and Conservation (Western Australia) and "critically endangered" under the Western Australian Government Biodiversity Conservation Act 2016. An Interim Recovery Plan has been prepared for subspecies orbifolia. Subspecies orbifolia is at a high risk of extinction due to P. cinnamomi infection and from damage caused by road maintenance activities. A proposal to translocate the subspecies has been prepared.
