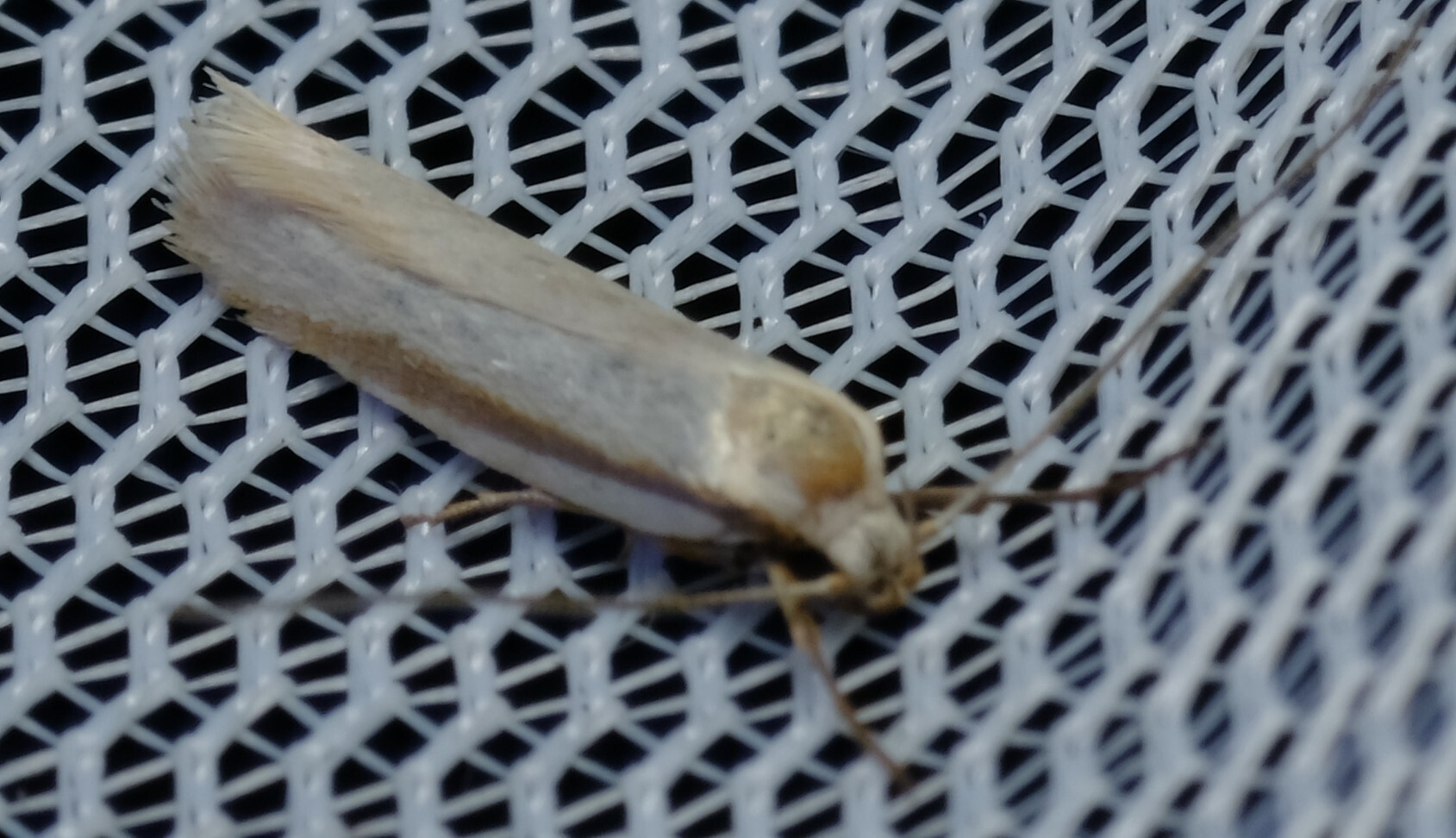

Scientific classification
- Domain: Eukaryota
- Kingdom: Animalia
- Phylum: Arthropoda
- Class: Insecta
- Order: Lepidoptera
- Family: Xyloryctidae
- Genus: Xylorycta
- Species: X. strigata

Binomial name
- Xylorycta strigata (Lewin, 1805)

Synonyms
- Cryptophasa strigata Lewin, 1805

= Xylorycta strigata =

Species of moth

Xylorycta strigata, commonly known as the banksia web-covering borer, is a species of moth in the family Xyloryctidae. It was first described by John Lewin in 1805. It is found in Australia, where it has been recorded from New South Wales, Queensland and South Australia.

The wingspan is 22–32 mm. The forewings are white with the dorsal half light fuscous and a moderate straight darker fuscous streak above the middle from the base to the apex. The hindwings are whitish-fuscous, more whitish towards the base, more or less suffused with darker fuscous towards the apex.

The larvae feed on Banksia serrata, Banksia aemula, Banksia paludosa, Banksia integrifolia and Lambertia formosa. They bore in the stem of their host plant and tie cut leaves at the entrance to the bore.
