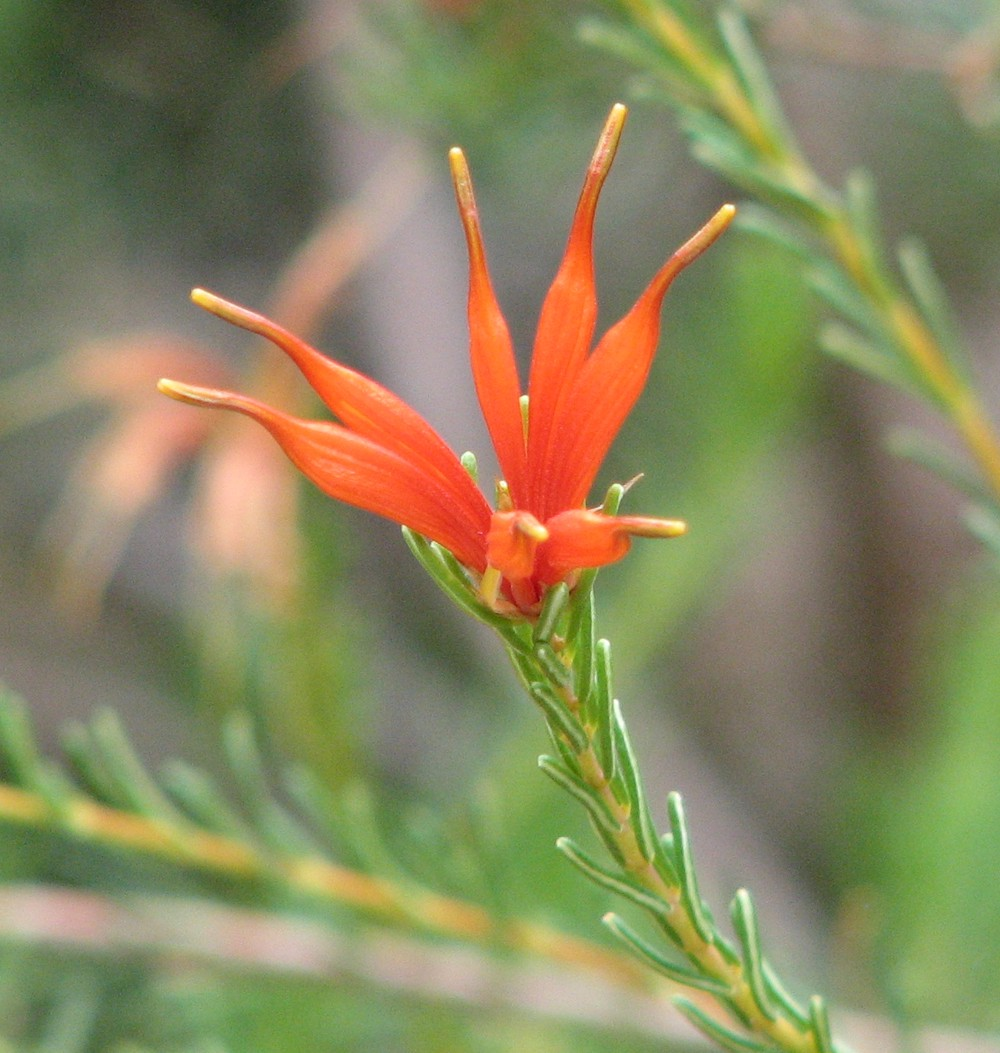

Scientific classification
- Kingdom: Plantae
- Clade: Embryophytes
- Clade: Tracheophytes
- Clade: Spermatophytes
- Clade: Angiosperms
- Clade: Eudicots
- Order: Proteales
- Family: Proteaceae
- Genus: Lambertia
- Species: L. ericifolia

Binomial name
- Lambertia ericifolia R.Br.

= Lambertia ericifolia =

Species of shrub endemic to Western Australia

Lambertia ericifolia, commonly known as heath-leaved honeysuckle, is a shrub which is endemic to the south-west of Western Australia. It grows up to 5 metres (16 ft) high and has orange to red flowers which appear from spring to autumn.

The species was formally described in 1830 by botanist Robert Brown based on plant material collected by William Baxter near King George Sound.
