= Aylmer Bourke Lambert =

British botanist

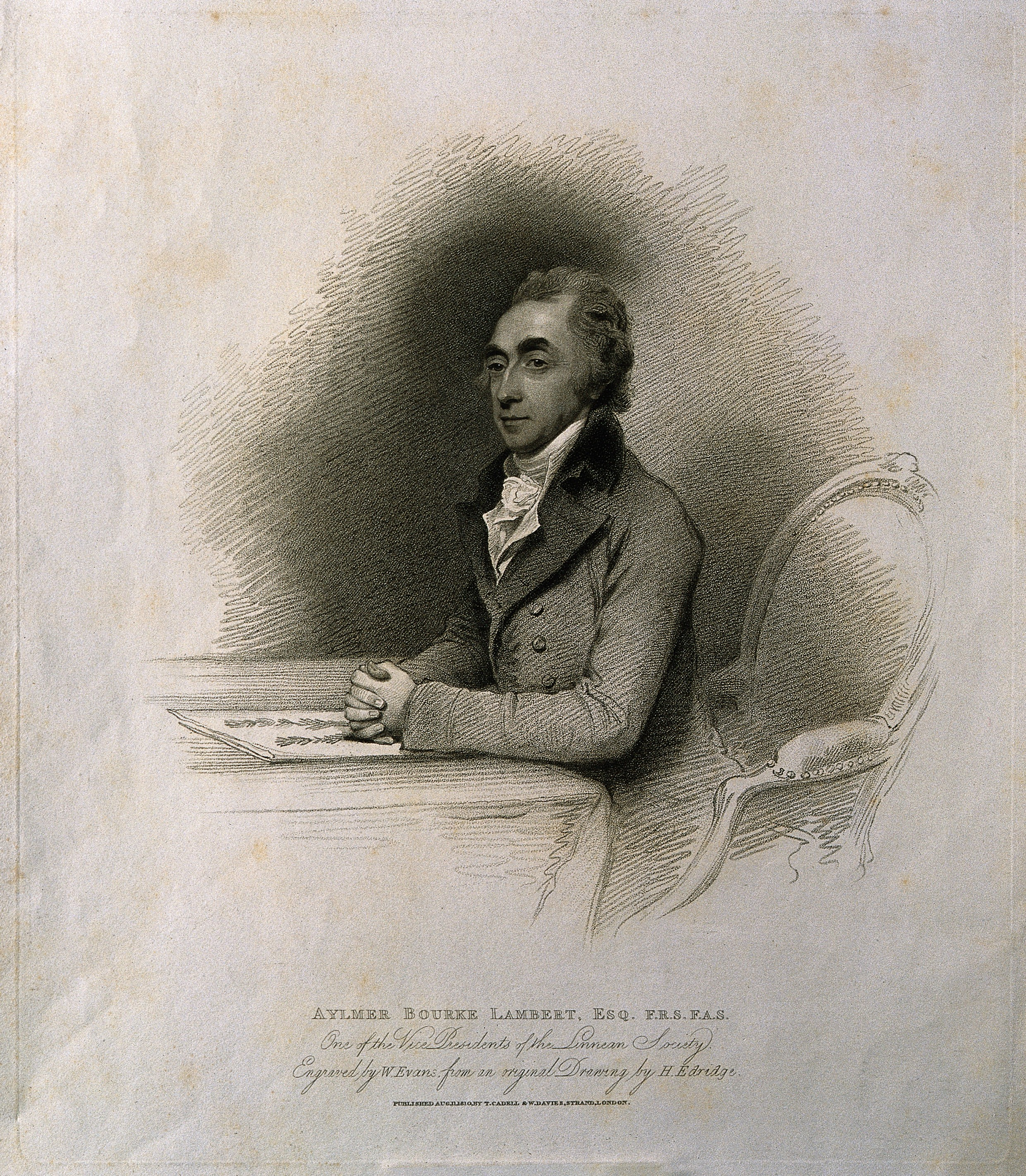
- Aylmer Bourke Lambert, 1810 engraving
- Born: Aylmer Bourke Lambert; 2 February 1761; Bath, Somerset
- Died: 10 January 1842 (aged 80)
- Education: University of Oxford
- Known for: A description of the genus Pinus
- Scientific career
- Author abbrev. (botany): Lamb.

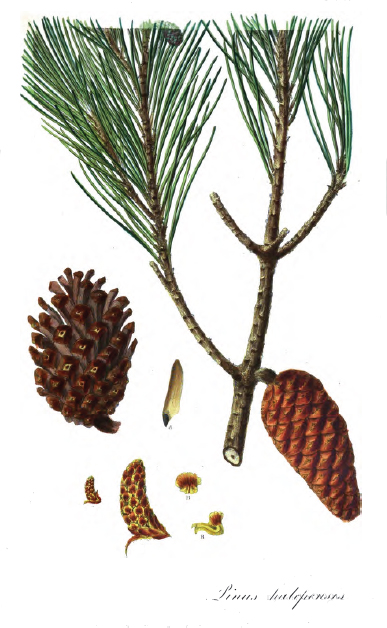
Pinus halepensis from 'Description of the Genus Pinus'

Aylmer Bourke Lambert (2 February 1761 – 10 January 1842) was a British botanist, one of the first fellows of the Linnean Society.

== Early life ==
Aylmer Bourke Lambert was born at Bath, England on 2 February 1761, the son of Edmund Lambert of Boyton House and Bridget Bourke who was the daughter of the 8th Viscount Mayo. Lambert's mother died in 1773, the same year that he started school and through her family he inherited estates in Jamaica and Ireland. Lambert went to Newcome's School for the sons of gentlemen at Hackney, and then attended Oxford University for three years.

== Writings ==
He is best known for his work A description of the genus Pinus, issued in several parts 1803–1824, a sumptuously illustrated folio volume detailing all of the conifers then known. A second folio edition was produced between 1828 and 1837, and a third, smaller (octavo) edition in 1832. Individual books even of the same edition are often very different from one another, which causes problems when the illustrations have been used as types to fix the application of names. A full description of the publication history is given in: Renkema, H. W. & Ardagh, J. (1930). Aylmer Bourke Lambert and his 'Description of the Genus Pinus'. Journal of the Linnean Society of London – Botany 48: 439–466.

Many of the new conifers discovered by David Douglas and others, including the Coast Redwood, were described for the first time in Lambert's books; several of these were actually described by collaborating authors, notably David Don, who included their work in Lambert's book.

== Herbarium ==
Lambert acquired a number of significant herbarium collections including those of Johann Reinhold Forster, Archibald Menzies and Henry de Ponthieu. He also amassed a large collection of specimens and drawings from Australia in the era immediately following the arrival of the First Fleet. Contributors included Governor Arthur Phillip, Surgeon-General John White, Colonel William Paterson, Major Robert Ross, Major Francis Grose and Philip Gidley King.

Lambert's collection of 50,000 preserved plant specimens, along with his extensive library, was consulted by authors and botanists including Robert Brown, De Candolle, Martius, George Don and David Don. It was auctioned following his death in 317 lots and specimens can be found in botanical collections around the world.

== Linnean Society ==
Lambert was one of the founding fellows of the Linnean Society in 1788. In 1796 Lambert was appointed by James Edward Smith as one of the four vice-presidents of the Linnean Society of London. He held this position until his death at his home on Kew Green in 1842.

== Royal Society ==
In 1791, Lambert was elected to the Royal Society of London for Improving Natural Knowledge and Joseph Banks made him a member of its Council in 1810.

"He was a friend and correspondent of Sir Joseph Banks, and took a great interest in the botanical and zoological discoveries emerging from New Holland in the late 18th and early 19th centuries, as they were transmitted back to London, whether as living or dead specimens, as seeds, or as drawings. Lambert compiled the collection from Surgeon General John White's specimens and drawings brought from Sydney to London in 1795."

== Honours and memorials ==
Lambert is honoured in the scientific name of the Sugar Pine (Pinus lambertiana), the genus Lambertia, and the variegated fairywren (Malurus lamberti). The standard botanical author abbreviation Lamb. is applied to species he described.

== Bibliography ==
- Anemaat, Louise; State Library of New South Wales (issuing body.) (2014), Natural curiosity : unseen art of the First Fleet, Sydney, NSW NewSouth Publishing, ISBN 978-1-74223-409-0
- Baldwin, William; Darlington, William (1969), Reliquiae Baldwinianae : selections from the correspondence of the late William Baldwin, Hafner; Reliquiæ Baldwinianæ: selections from the correspondence of the late William Baldwin ... with occasional notes, and a short biographical memoir. Compiled by William Darlington (1st ed.). Philadelphia, Kimber and Sharpless. 1843. LCCN 15022849; Consists mainly of the correspondence between Dr. Baldwin and Dr. Gotthilf Heinrich Ernst Muhlenberg on American botany
- Boulger, George Symonds (1892). "Lambert, Aylmer Bourke" . In Lee, Sidney (ed.). Dictionary of National Biography. Vol. 32. London: Smith, Elder & Co. pp. 6–7.
- Elbert L. Little, Jr. "Lambert's 'Description of the Genus Pinus,' 1832 Edition". Madrono, 10:33–47. 1949.
- H. W. Renkema and John Ardagh. "Aylmer Bourke Lambert and his 'Description of the Genus Pinus'". The Journal of the Linnean Society of London, 48:439–466. 1928–1931.
