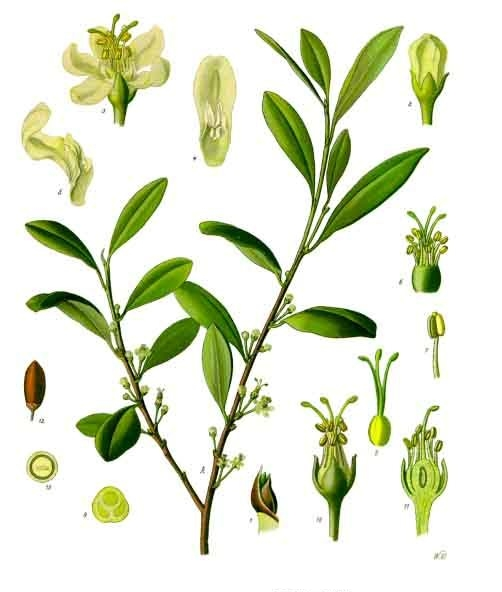

Scientific classification
- Kingdom: Plantae
- Clade: Tracheophytes
- Clade: Angiosperms
- Clade: Eudicots
- Clade: Rosids
- Order: Malpighiales
- Family: Erythroxylaceae
- Genus: Erythroxylum
- Species: E. coca

Binomial name
- Erythroxylum coca Lam.
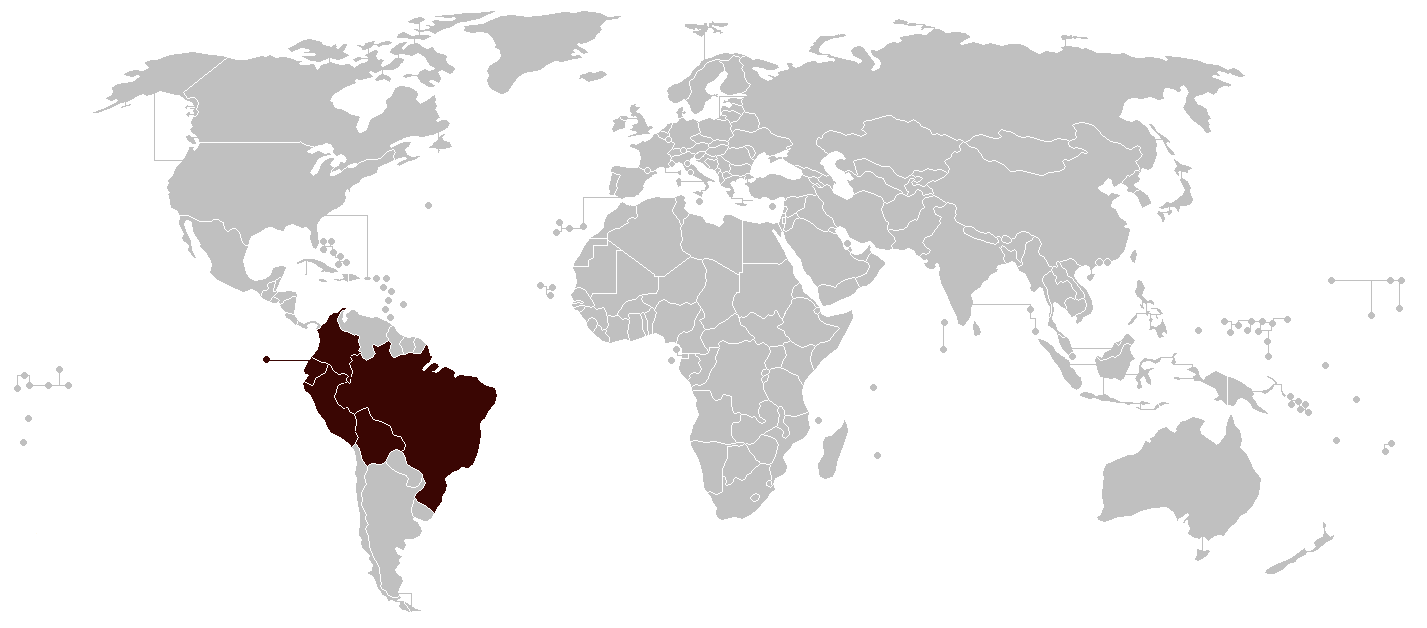
- Distribution of the species

= Erythroxylum coca =

Coca

Species of flowering plant

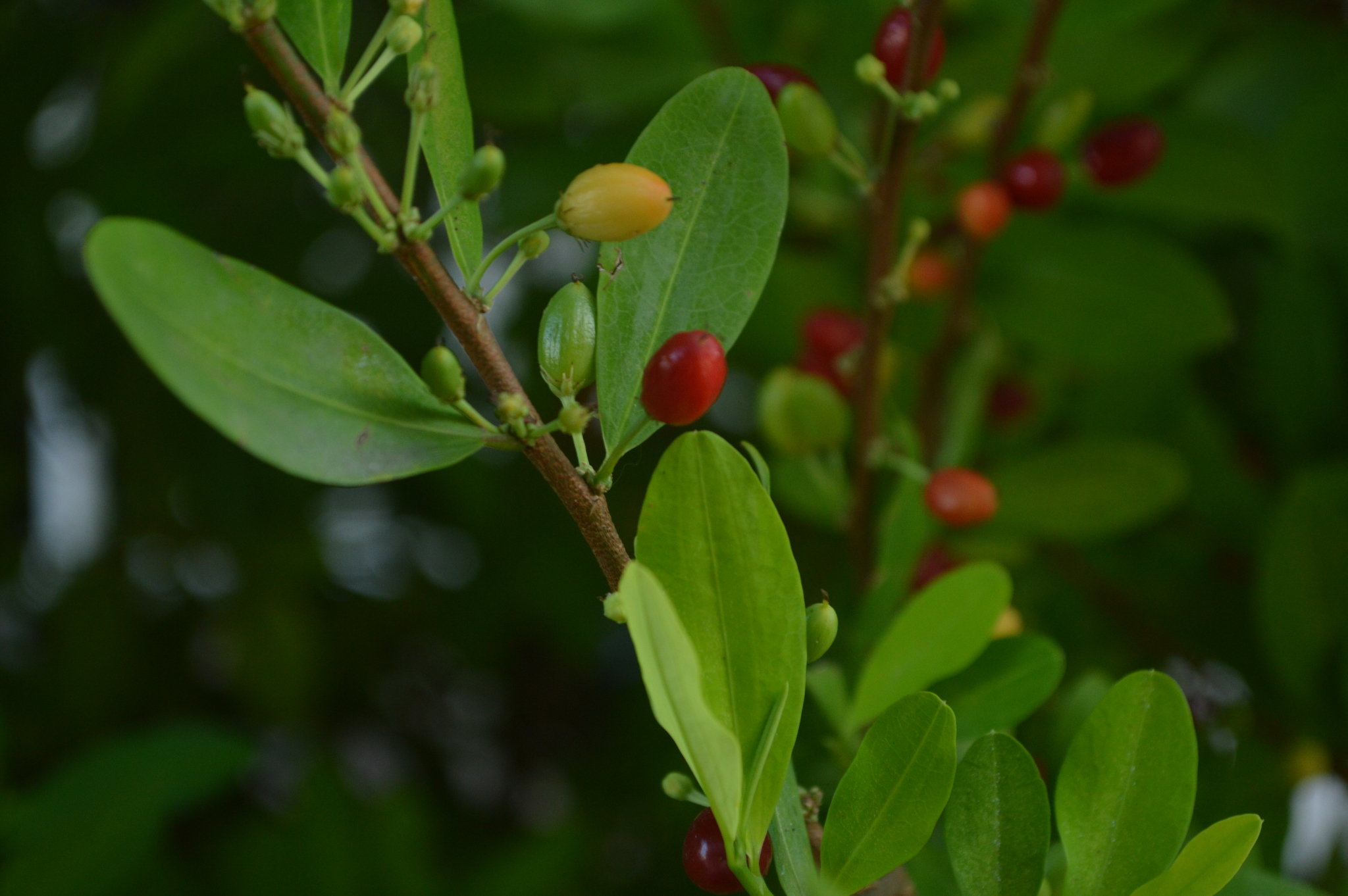
Coca leaves and fruits

Erythroxylum coca is a species of flowering plant in the family Erythroxylaceae. It is one of the two species of cultivated coca.

== Description ==
The coca plant resembles a blackthorn bush, and grows to a height of 2–3 m (7–10 ft). The branches are straight, and the leaves, which have a green tint, are thin, opaque, oval, and taper at the extremities. A marked characteristic of the leaf is an areolated portion bounded by two longitudinal curved lines, one line on each side of the midrib, and it is more conspicuous on the underside of the leaf. Coca plants are mainly found in Colombia.

The flowers are small, and disposed in little clusters on short stalks; the corolla is composed of five yellowish-white petals, the anthers are heart-shaped, and the pistil consists of three carpels united to form a three-chambered ovary. The flowers mature into red berries.

Unlike Erythroxylum novogranatense, Erythroxylum coca requires very acidic soil conditions. Soil acidity and water acidity need to be below pH 5.5, with the optimal value being pH 3.5, similar to that of Rhododendron potting soils. At pH 6.5 and above, chlorosis and leaf distortion occur.

Of the two cultivated species of coca, Erythroxylum coca has greater resistance to the use of glyphosate as an herbicide than Erythroxylum novogranatense.

== Taxonomy ==
Among the genus Erythroxylum, cocaine-rich leaves are obtained from four taxa:

- Erythroxylum coca var. coca
- Erythroxylum coca var. ipadu
- Erythroxylum novogranatense var. novogranatense
- Erythroxylum novogranatense var. truxillense

== Amazonian coca ==
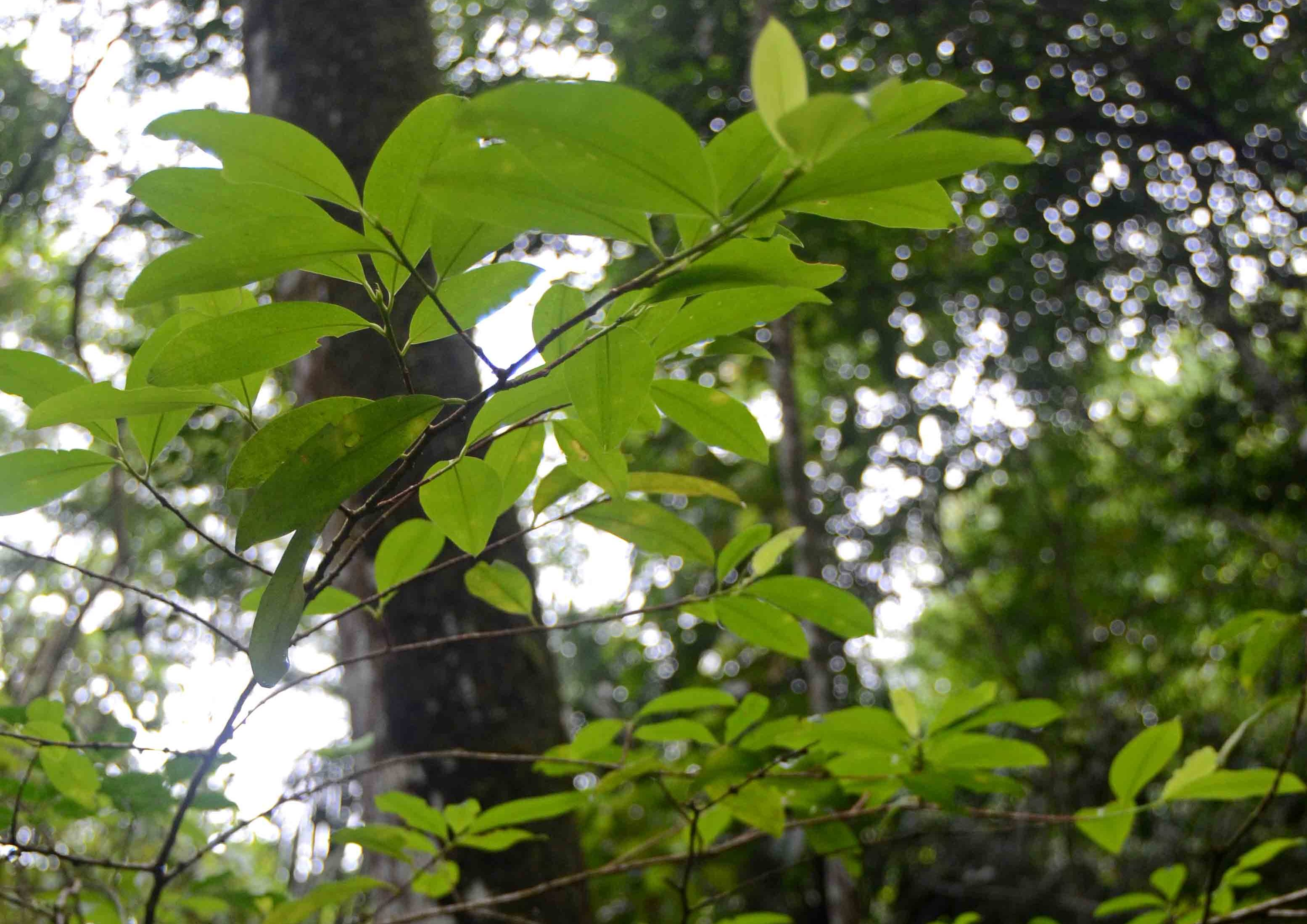
Amazonian coca

Erythroxylum coca var. ipadu, also known as Amazonian coca, is closely related to Erythroxylum coca var. coca, from which it originated relatively recently. E. coca var. ipadu does not escape cultivation or survive as a feral or wild plant like E. coca var. coca. It has been suggested that due to a lack of genetic isolation to differentiate it from E. coca var. coca, E. coca var. ipadu may be better defined as a distinct cultivar than a taxonomic variety.

Unlike the other species of coca which are propagated through seeds, E. coca var. ipadu, which rarely produces seeds, is propagated through stem cuttings which remain viable for several weeks if kept moist. Since Amazonian coca is vegetatively propagated, entire plantations may be populated from the same clone. E. coca var. ipadu is specially adapted to the shifting agriculture of semi-nomadic Amazonian peoples. Since cuttings of E. coca var. coca do not easily root; it is likely that E. coca var. ipadu has been artificially selected for its ease of vegetative propagation. In contrast to the Andean E. coca var. coca, Amazonian E. coca var. ipadu is typically a weaker plant, evidenced by the fact that after a few years plants lose their vigor and easily fall prey to disease or insect infestation. Overharvesting can speed up this process.

Amazonian coca is prepared differently than the other three cultivated cocas. After fire-toasting the leaves dry, they are pulverized. Once sifted, the powder is combined with ashes from plants, which serve as the necessary alkaline admixture for coca chewing.

== Ecology ==
The leaves are sometimes eaten by the larvae of the moth Eloria noyesi.

== Coca alkaloids ==
Coca alkaloids are the alkaloids found in the coca plant. They are predominantly of either the pyrrolidine or the tropane types.

Tropane-type alkaloids include:

- Benzoylecgonine
- Cocaine
- Ecgonidine
- Ecgonine
- Hydroxytropacocaine
- Methylecgonine cinnamate
- Tropacocaine
- Truxilline

Pyrrolidine-type alkaloids include:

- Cuscohygrine
- Dihydrocuscohygrine
- Hygrine
- Nicotine

== See also ==
- Coca wine, an alcoholic beverage combining wine with extracted coca alkaloids
