= Pyrrolidine alkaloids =

Class of chemical compounds

pyrrolidine, the fundamental chemical structure of pyrrolidine alkaloids.

The pyrrolidine alkaloids are natural products chemically derived from pyrrolidine.

== Occurrence ==
Alkaloids with partial pyrrolidine structure are usually sub-categorized based on their occurrence and biogenetic origin. Hygrin and cuscohygrin were isolated from the leaves of the coca shrub, while (-)-codonopsinine was isolated from the woodland vine tiger bell.

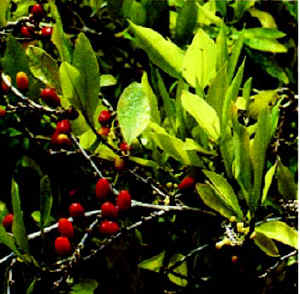
Coca shrub (Erythroxylum coca) with leaves and fruits.

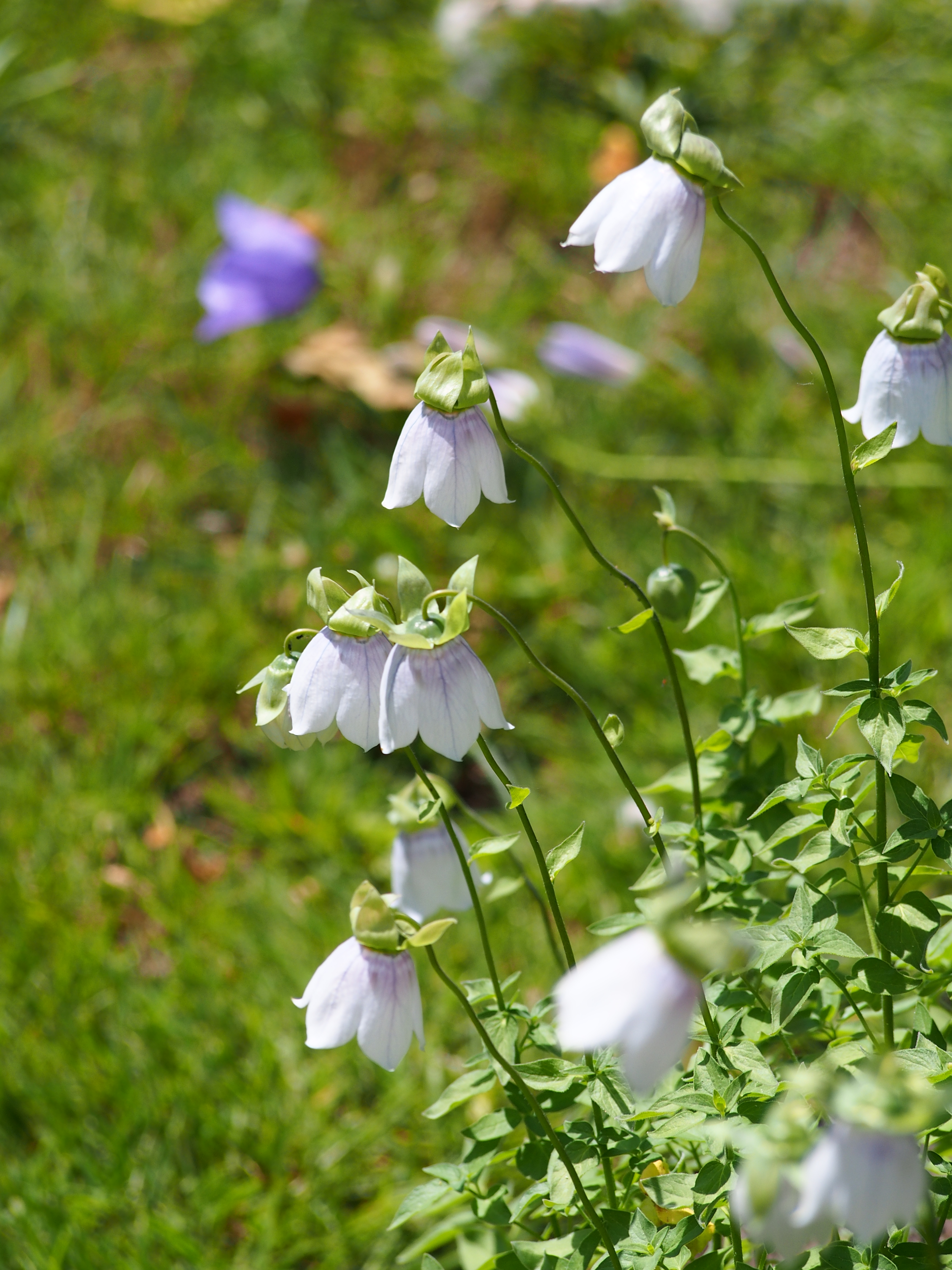
Wood vine tiger bell (Codonopsis clematidea)

== Representatives ==
Among the most important representatives of the pyrrolidine alkaloids are hygrine and cuscohygrine. Another representative is the (-)-codonopsinine. Furthermore, ruspolinone, norruspolinone and norruspoline also belong to this alkaloid group.

(+)-Hygrine

(-)-Codonopsinine

(-)-Ruspolinone

(R)-Norruspoline

== Properties ==
Many plants containing cuscohygrin are used in the folk medicine of various peoples as sedatives or narcotics.
