= C10H9NO2 =

The molecular formula C_{10}H_{9}NO_{2} (molar mass: 175.18 g/mol, exact mass: 175.0633 u) may refer to:

- Gentianine, a pyridine-derived alkaloid found in some plants
- 5-Hydroxyindoleacetaldehyde
- Indole-3-acetic acid, the most common naturally occurring plant hormone of the auxin class
