= Esterom =

Investigational drug being studied as a topical analgesic

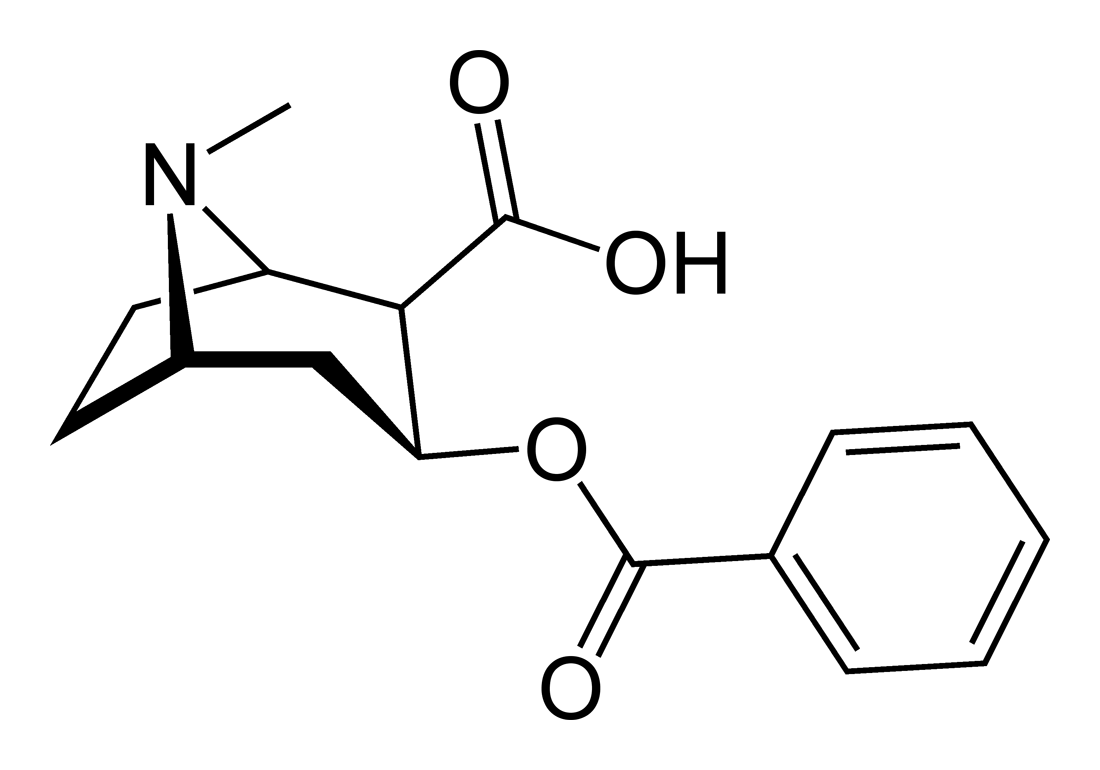

- Benzoylecgonine (top), the major component, and hydroxypropyl benzoylecgonine (bottom), the most active component

Clinical data
- Trade names: Esterom

Identifiers
- DrugBank: DB01515

Esterom is an investigational drug that was studied for use as a topical analgesic. Chemically, it is a mixture of compounds derived from the esterification of cocaine in propylene glycol. While the major component is benzoylecgonine, the analgesic activity is likely due to hydroxypropyl benzoylecgonine, the only component that penetrates the skin. Clinical trials of Esterom failed so show a statistically significant benefit for patients in 2002 and was never approved.
