= C15H19NO3 =

The molecular formula C_{15}H_{19}NO_{3} may refer to:

- Hydroxytropacocaine
- 3',4'-Methylenedioxy-α-pyrrolidinobutiophenone
