= Benzoylecgonine =

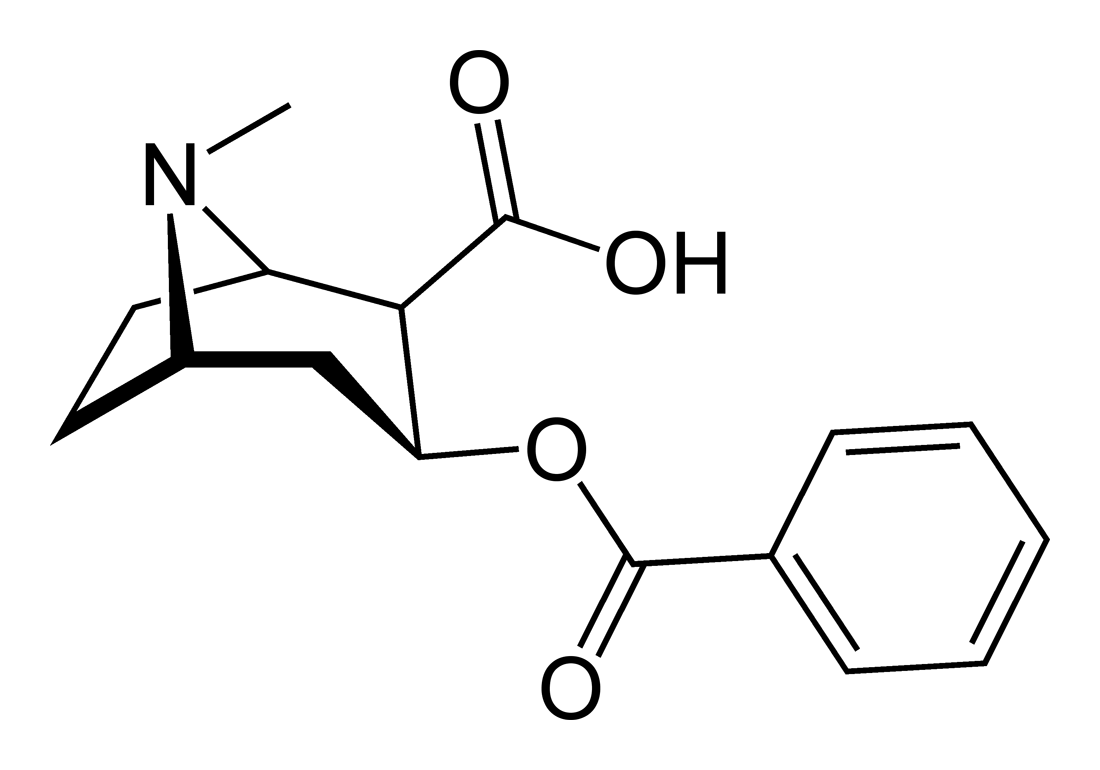

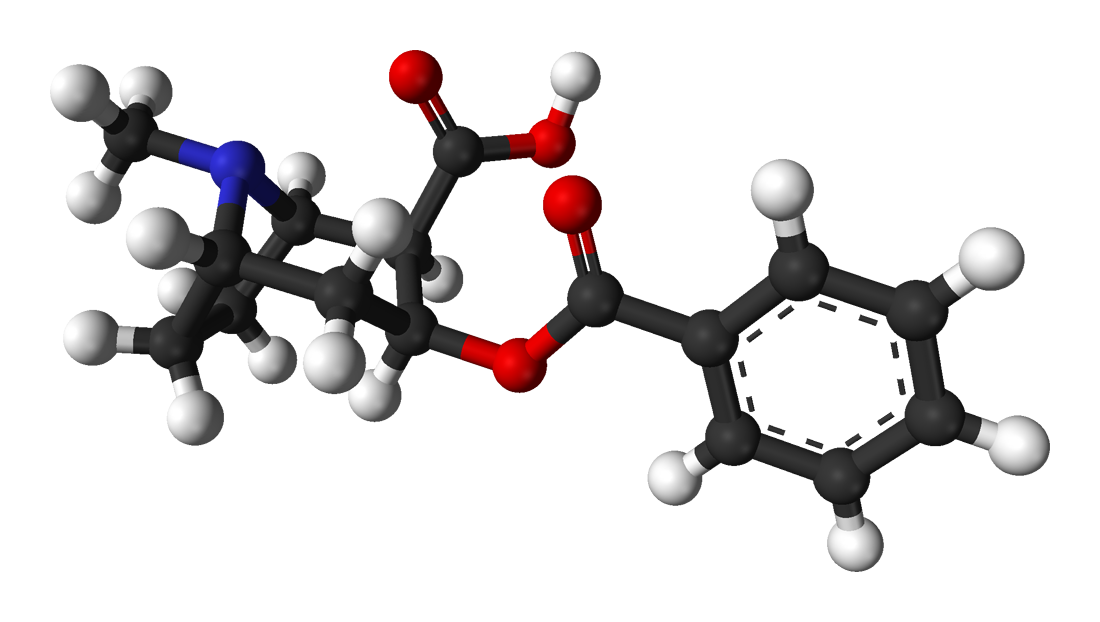

Names
- IUPAC name 3β-(Benzoyloxy)tropane-2β-carboxylic acid
- Systematic IUPAC name (1R,2R,3S,5S)-3-(Benzoyloxy)-8-methyl-8-azabicyclo[3.2.1]octane-2-carboxylic acid

Identifiers
CAS Number	519-09-5
3D model (JSmol)	Interactive image
Beilstein Reference	89637
ChEBI	CHEBI:41001
ChemSpider	395095
DrugBank	DB01515
ECHA InfoCard	100.007.513
EC Number	208-263-5
KEGG	C10847
PubChem CID	448223
UNII	5353I8I6YS
CompTox Dashboard (EPA)	DTXSID7046758
- InChI: InChI=1S/C16H19NO4/c1-17-11-7-8-12(17)14(15(18)19)13(9-11)21-16(20)10-5-3-2-4-6-10/h2-6,11-14H,7-9H2,1H3,(H,18,19)/t11-,12+,13-,14+/m0/s1 Key: GVGYEFKIHJTNQZ-RFQIPJPRSA-N; InChI=1/C16H19NO4/c1-17-11-7-8-12(17)14(15(18)19)13(9-11)21-16(20)10-5-3-2-4-6-10/h2-6,11-14H,7-9H2,1H3,(H,18,19)/t11-,12+,13-,14+/m0/s1 Key: GVGYEFKIHJTNQZ-RFQIPJPRBD
- SMILES: CN1[C@H]2CC[C@@H]1[C@H]([C@H](C2)OC(=O)c3ccccc3)C(=O)O

Properties
Chemical formula	C_{16}H_{19}NO_{4}
Molar mass	289.331 g·mol^{−1}

Hazards
- GHS labelling
Pictograms	(GHS06: Toxic)
Signal word	Danger
Hazard statements	H301
Precautionary statements	P264, P270, P301+P310, P321, P330, P405, P501
- Except where otherwise noted, data are given for materials in their standard state (at 25 °C [77 °F], 100 kPa). verify (what is ?) Infobox references

Benzoylecgonine is the main metabolite of cocaine, formed by the liver and excreted in the urine. It is the compound tested for in most cocaine urine drug screens and in wastewater screenings for cocaine use.

== Biochemistry and physiology ==
Chemically, benzoylecgonine is the benzoate ester of ecgonine. It is a primary metabolite of cocaine, and is pharmacologically inactive. It is the corresponding carboxylic acid of cocaine, its methyl ester. It is formed in the liver by the metabolism of cocaine by hydrolysis, catalysed by carboxylesterases, and subsequently excreted in the urine. It is readily synthesised by boiling cocaine freebase in water.

== Urinalysis ==
Benzoylecgonine is the compound tested for in most substantive cocaine drug urinalyses.

== Presence in drinking water ==
Benzoylecgonine is sometimes found in drinking water supplies. In 2005, scientists found large quantities of benzoylecgonine in Italy's Po River and used its concentration to estimate the number of cocaine users in the region. In 2006, a similar study was performed in the Swiss ski town of Saint-Moritz using wastewater to estimate the daily cocaine consumption of the population. A study done in the United Kingdom found traces of benzoylecgonine in the country's drinking water supply, along with carbamazepine (an anticonvulsant) and ibuprofen (a common non-steroidal anti-inflammatory drug. The study noted that the amount of each compound present was several orders of magnitude lower than the therapeutic dose and therefore did not pose a risk to the population.

Preliminary studies on ecological systems show that benzoylecgonine presents potential toxicity problems. Research is being conducted on degradation options such as advanced oxidation and photocatalysis for this metabolite in an effort to reduce concentrations in waste and surface waters. At environmentally relevant concentrations, benzoylecgonine has been shown to have a negative ecological impact.

== See also ==
- Coca alkaloids
- Dihydrocuscohygrine
- Hygrine
