= Cuscohygrine =

- Chemical structure of cuscohygrine

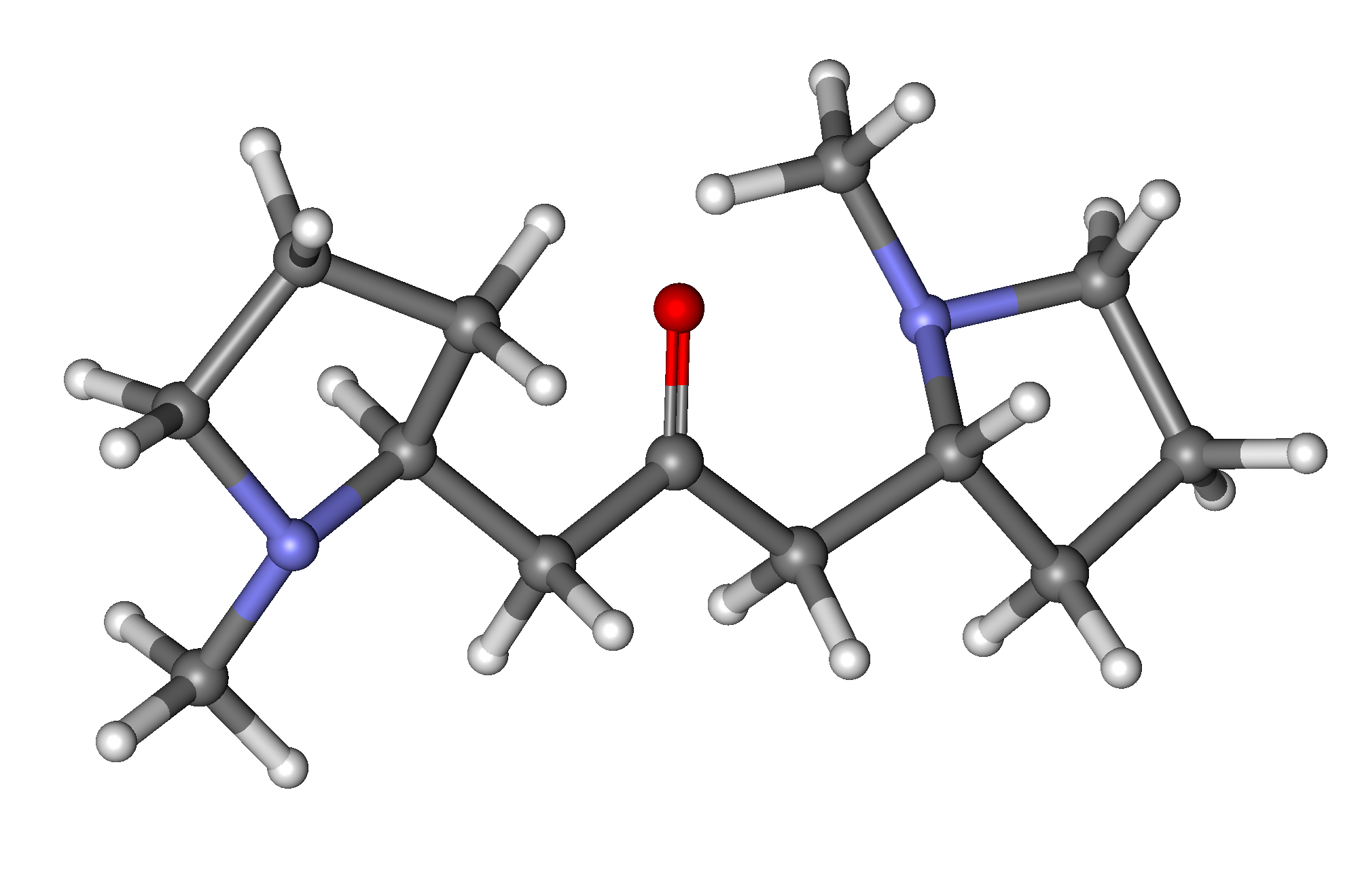

Names
- Preferred IUPAC name 1-[(2R)-1-Methylpyrrolidin-2-yl]-3-[(2S)-1-methylpyrrolidin-2-yl]propan-2-one

Identifiers
CAS Number	454-14-8
3D model (JSmol)	Interactive image
ChemSpider	21864896
KEGG	C06521
PubChem CID	1201543
UNII	93FJ3823VL
CompTox Dashboard (EPA)	DTXSID70894079
- InChI: InChI=1S/C13H24N2O/c1-14-7-3-5-11(14)9-13(16)10-12-6-4-8-15(12)2/h11-12H,3-10H2,1-2H3/t11-,12+ Key: ZEBIACKKLGVLFZ-TXEJJXNPSA-N
- SMILES: CN1CCC[C@@H]1CC(=O)C[C@@H]2CCCN2C

Properties
Chemical formula	C_{13}H_{24}N_{2}O
Molar mass	224.348 g·mol^{−1}
Melting point	40–41 °C (104–106 °F; 313–314 K) (trihydrate)
- Except where otherwise noted, data are given for materials in their standard state (at 25 °C [77 °F], 100 kPa). Infobox references

Cuscohygrine is a bis N-methyl pyrrolidine alkaloid found in coca plants. It can also be extracted from plants of the family Solanaceae, including Atropa belladonna (deadly nightshade) and various Datura species. Cuscohygrine usually occurs along with other, more potent alkaloids such as atropine or cocaine.

Cuscohygrine, along with the related metabolite hygrine, was first isolated by Carl Liebermann in 1889 as an alkaloid accompanying cocaine in coca leaves (also known as Cusco-leaves).

Cuscohygrine is an oil that can be distilled without decomposition only in vacuum. It is soluble in water. It also forms a crystalline trihydrate which melts at 40–41 °C.

== Biosynthesis ==
Ornithine is methylated to N-methylornithine and when decarboxylated, becomes N-methylputrescine. 4-methylaminobutanal is yielded from the oxidation of the primary amino-group. 4-methylaminobutanal then cyclizes to an N-methyl-1-pyrrolinium salt salt. The condensation of the pyrrolinium salt with acetoacetyl coenzyme A yields hygrine. Finally, the condensation of the hygrine molecule with another molecule of pyrrolidinium salt yields cuscohygrine.

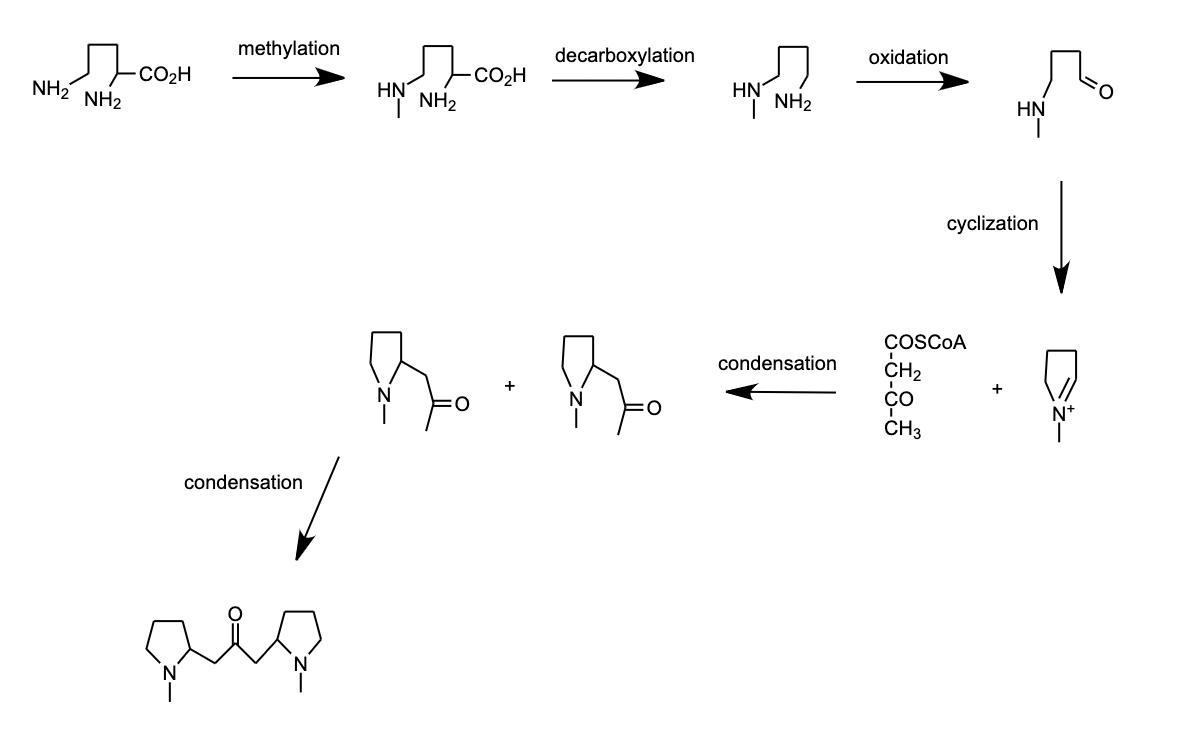
Biosynthesis of Cuscohygrine

== See also ==
- Coca alkaloids
- Dihydrocuscohygrine
