= Alkaloid =

Class of naturally occurring chemical compounds

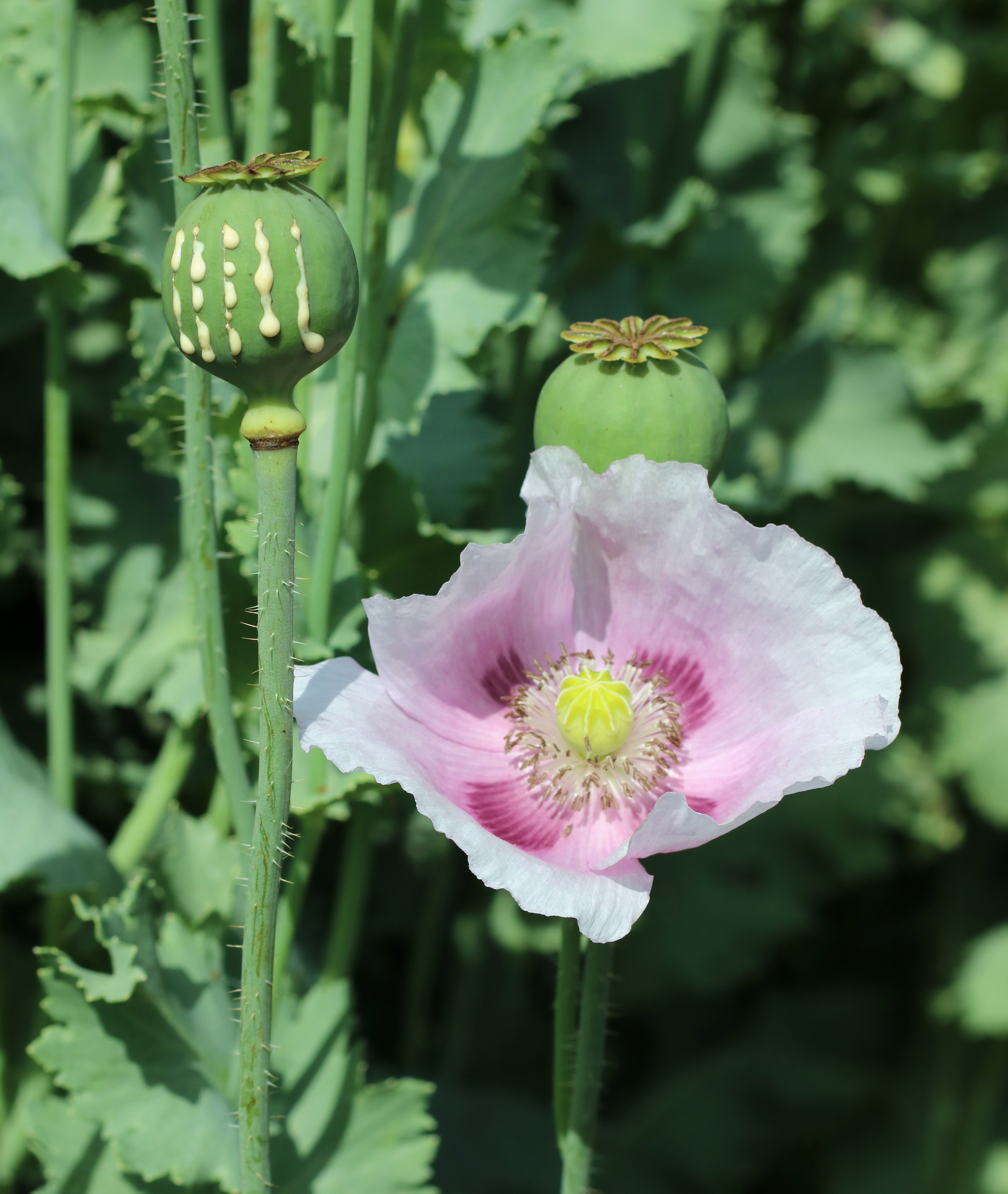
The first individual alkaloid, morphine, was isolated in 1804 from the opium poppy (Papaver somniferum).

Alkaloids are a broad class of naturally occurring organic compounds that contain at least one nitrogen atom. Some synthetic compounds of similar structure may also be termed alkaloids.

Alkaloids are produced by a large variety of organisms including bacteria, fungi, plants, and animals. They can be purified from crude extracts of these organisms by acid-base extraction, or solvent extractions followed by silica-gel column chromatography. Alkaloids have a wide range of pharmacological activities including antimalarial (e.g. quinine), antiasthma (e.g. ephedrine), anticancer (e.g. homoharringtonine), cholinomimetic (e.g. galantamine), vasodilatory (e.g. vincamine), antiarrhythmic (e.g. quinidine), analgesic (e.g. morphine), antibacterial (e.g. chelerythrine), and antihyperglycemic activities (e.g. berberine). Many have found use in traditional or modern medicine, or as starting points for drug discovery. Other alkaloids possess psychotropic (e.g. psilocin) and stimulant activities (e.g. cocaine, caffeine, nicotine, theobromine), and have been used in entheogenic rituals or as recreational drugs. Alkaloids can be toxic (e.g. atropine, tubocurarine). Although alkaloids act on a diversity of metabolic systems in humans and other animals, they almost uniformly evoke a bitter taste.

The boundary between alkaloids and other nitrogen-containing natural compounds is not clear-cut. Most alkaloids are basic, although some have neutral and even weakly acidic properties. In addition to carbon, hydrogen and nitrogen, alkaloids may also contain oxygen or sulfur. Compounds like amino acid peptides, proteins, nucleotides, nucleic acids, amines, and antibiotics are usually not called alkaloids. Natural compounds containing nitrogen in the exocyclic position (mescaline, serotonin, dopamine, etc.) are usually classified as amines rather than as alkaloids. Some authors, however, consider alkaloids a special case of amines.

== Naming ==
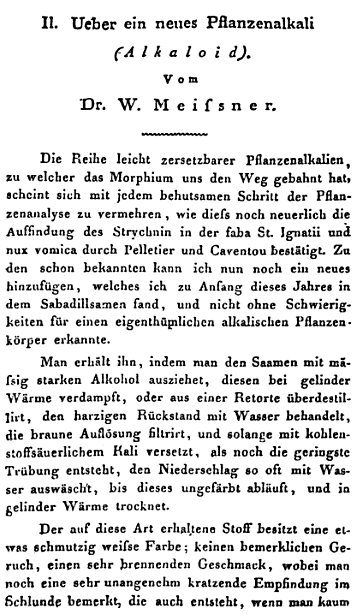
The article that introduced the concept of "alkaloid".

The name "alkaloids" (German: Alkaloide) was introduced in 1819 by German chemist Carl Friedrich Wilhelm Meissner, and is derived from late Latin root alkali and the Greek-language suffix -οειδής -('like'). However, the term came into wide use only after the publication of a review article, by Oscar Jacobsen in the chemical dictionary of Albert Ladenburg in the 1880s.

The name "alkaloid" was introduced, since at the time, chemists conceptualized the category of "alkaline" in such a way that plants cannot produce alkaline. For instance, potash, an alkaline substance that can be extracted from plants by burning, was thought to be either produced during burning, or extracted by plant from the soil. Subsequent research by chemists to extract the "principle" (what we nowadays call the active ingredient) of medicinal plants, led to the discovery of various substances that had properties resembling alkalines as understood at the time. These substances were variously named "salifiable vegetable bases", "vegetable organic compounds", "organic bases", etc. After enough such substances were discovered, these substances were classified as "alkaloid", a new chemical category.

There is no unique method for naming alkaloids. Many individual names are formed by adding the suffix "ine" to the species or genus name. For example, atropine is isolated from the plant Atropa belladonna; strychnine is obtained from the seed of the Strychnine tree (Strychnos nux-vomica L.). Where several alkaloids are extracted from one plant their names are often distinguished by variations in the suffix: "idine", "anine", "aline", "inine" etc. There are also at least 86 alkaloids whose names contain the root "vin" because they are extracted from vinca plants such as Vinca rosea (Catharanthus roseus); these are called vinca alkaloids.

== History ==
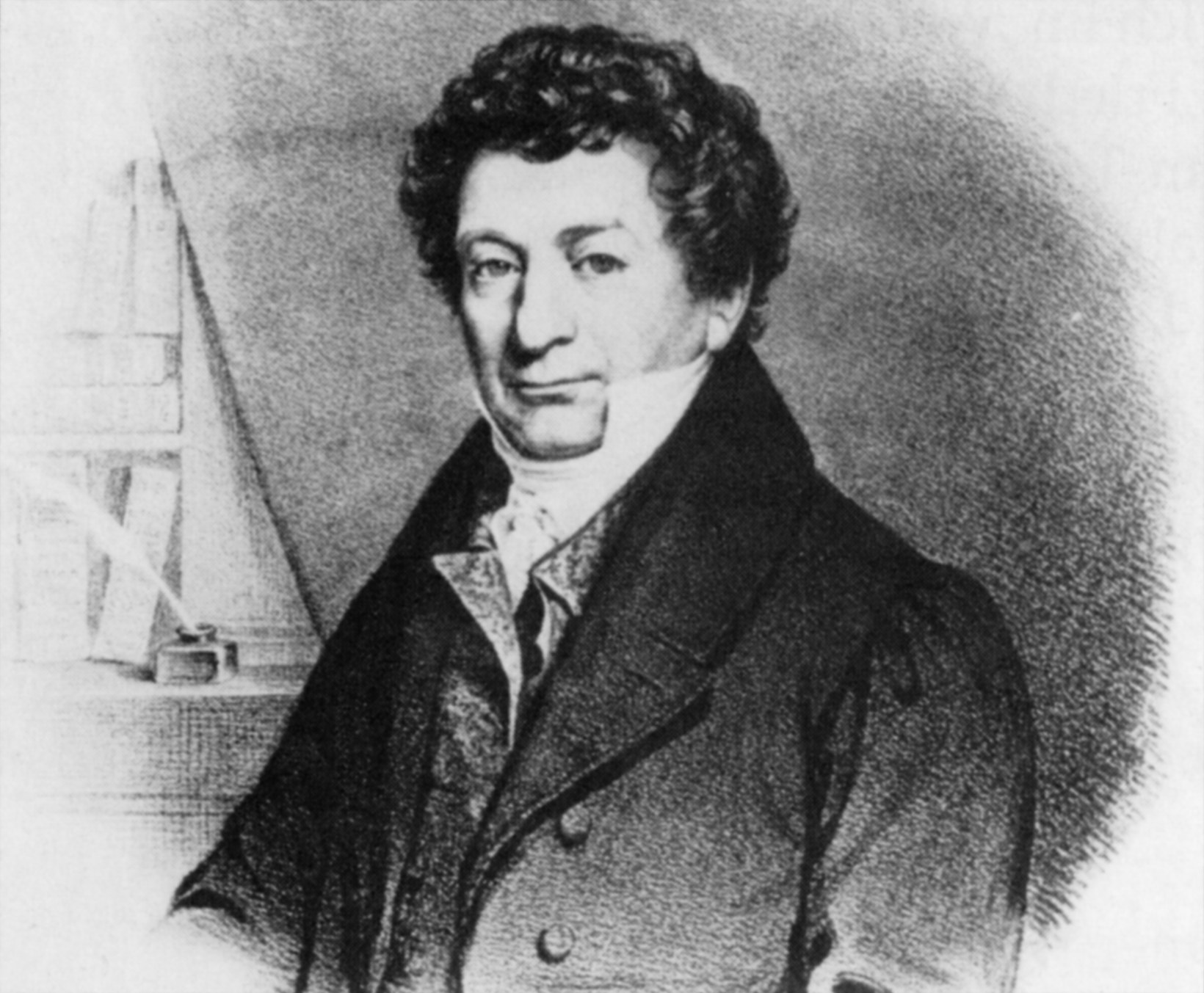
Friedrich Sertürner, the German chemist who first isolated morphine from opium.

Alkaloid-containing plants have been used by humans since ancient times for therapeutic and recreational purposes. For example, medicinal plants have been known in Mesopotamia from about 2000 BC. The Odyssey of Homer referred to a gift given to Helen by the Egyptian queen, a drug bringing oblivion. It is believed that the gift was an opium-containing drug. A Chinese book on houseplants written in 1st–3rd centuries BC mentioned a medical use of ephedra and opium poppies. Also, coca leaves have been used by Indigenous South Americans since ancient times.

Extracts from plants containing toxic alkaloids, such as aconitine and tubocurarine, were used since antiquity for poisoning arrows.

Studies of alkaloids began in the 19th century. In 1804, the German chemist Friedrich Sertürner isolated from opium a "soporific principle" (Latin: principium somniferum), which he called "morphium", referring to Morpheus, the Greek god of dreams; in German and some other Central-European languages, this is still the name of the drug. The term "morphine", used in English and French, was given by the French physicist Joseph Louis Gay-Lussac.

A significant contribution to the chemistry of alkaloids in the early years of its development was made by the French researchers Pierre Joseph Pelletier and Joseph Bienaimé Caventou, who discovered quinine (1820) and strychnine (1818). Several other alkaloids were discovered around that time, including xanthine (1817), atropine (1819), caffeine (1820), coniine (1827), nicotine (1828), colchicine (1833), sparteine (1851), and cocaine (1860). The development of the chemistry of alkaloids was accelerated by the emergence of spectroscopic and chromatographic methods in the 20th century, so that by 2008 more than 12,000 alkaloids had been identified.

The first complete synthesis of an alkaloid was achieved in 1886 by the German chemist Albert Ladenburg. He produced coniine by reacting 2-methylpyridine with acetaldehyde and reducing the resulting 2-propenyl pyridine with sodium.

Bufotenin, an alkaloid from some toads, contains an indole core, and is produced in living organisms from the amino acid tryptophan.

== Classifications ==
The nicotine molecule contains both pyridine (left) and pyrrolidine (right) rings.

Compared with most other classes of natural compounds, alkaloids are characterized by a great structural diversity. There is no uniform classification. Initially, when knowledge of chemical structures was lacking, botanical classification of the source plants was relied on. This classification is now considered obsolete.

More recent classifications are based on similarity of the carbon skeleton (e.g., indole-, isoquinoline-, and pyridine-like) or biochemical precursor (ornithine, lysine, tyrosine, tryptophan). However, they require compromises in borderline cases; for example, nicotine contains a pyridine fragment from nicotinamide and a pyrrolidine part from ornithine and therefore can be assigned to both classes.

Alkaloids are often divided into the following major groups:

1. "True alkaloids" contain nitrogen in the heterocycle and originate from amino acids. Their characteristic examples are atropine, nicotine, and morphine. This group also includes some alkaloids that besides the nitrogen heterocycle contain terpene (e.g., evonine) or peptide fragments (e.g. ergotamine). The piperidine alkaloids coniine and coniceine may be regarded as true alkaloids (rather than pseudoalkaloids: see below) although they do not originate from amino acids.
2. "Protoalkaloids", which contain nitrogen (but not the nitrogen heterocycle) and also originate from amino acids. Examples include mescaline, adrenaline and ephedrine.
3. Polyamine alkaloids – derivatives of putrescine, spermidine, and spermine.
4. Peptide and cyclopeptide alkaloids.
5. Pseudoalkaloids – alkaloid-like compounds that do not originate from amino acids. This group includes terpene-like and steroid-like alkaloids, as well as purine-like alkaloids such as caffeine, theobromine, theacrine and theophylline. Some authors classify ephedrine and cathinone as pseudoalkaloids. Those originate from the amino acid phenylalanine, but acquire their nitrogen atom not from the amino acid but through transamination.

Some alkaloids do not have the carbon skeleton characteristic of their group. So, galanthamine and homoaporphines do not contain isoquinoline fragment, but are, in general, attributed to isoquinoline alkaloids.

Main classes of monomeric alkaloids are listed in the table below:

Class	Major groups	Main synthesis steps	Examples
Alkaloids with nitrogen heterocycles (true alkaloids)
Pyrrolidine derivatives		Ornithine or arginine → putrescine → N-methylputrescine → N-methyl-Δ^{1}-pyrroline	Cuscohygrine, hygrine, hygroline, stachydrine
Tropane derivatives	Atropine group Substitution in positions 3, 6 or 7	Ornithine or arginine → putrescine → N-methylputrescine → N-methyl-Δ^{1}-pyrroline	Atropine, scopolamine, hyoscyamine
Tropane derivatives	Cocaine group Substitution in positions 2 and 3	Ornithine or arginine → putrescine → N-methylputrescine → N-methyl-Δ^{1}-pyrroline	Cocaine, ecgonine
Pyrrolizidine derivatives	Non-esters	In plants: ornithine or arginine → putrescine → homospermidine → retronecine	Retronecine, heliotridine, laburnine
Pyrrolizidine derivatives	Complex esters of monocarboxylic acids	In plants: ornithine or arginine → putrescine → homospermidine → retronecine	Indicine, lindelophin, sarracine
Pyrrolizidine derivatives	Macrocyclic diesters	In plants: ornithine or arginine → putrescine → homospermidine → retronecine	Platyphylline, trichodesmine
Pyrrolizidine derivatives	1-aminopyrrolizidines (lolines)	In fungi: L-proline + L-homoserine → N-(3-amino-3-carboxypropyl)proline → norloline	Loline, N-formylloline, N-acetylloline
Piperidine derivatives		Lysine → cadaverine → Δ^{1}-piperideine	Sedamine, lobeline, anaferine, piperine
Piperidine derivatives		Octanoic acid → coniceine → coniine	Coniine, coniceine
Quinolizidine derivatives	Lupinine group	Lysine → cadaverine → Δ^{1}-piperideine	Lupinine, nupharidin
Quinolizidine derivatives	Cytisine group	Lysine → cadaverine → Δ^{1}-piperideine	Cytisine
Quinolizidine derivatives	Sparteine group	Lysine → cadaverine → Δ^{1}-piperideine	Sparteine, lupanine, anahygrine
Quinolizidine derivatives	Matrine group.	Lysine → cadaverine → Δ^{1}-piperideine	Matrine, oxymatrine, allomatridine
Quinolizidine derivatives	Ormosanine group	Lysine → cadaverine → Δ^{1}-piperideine	Ormosanine, piptantine
Indolizidine derivatives		Lysine → δ-semialdehyde of α-aminoadipic acid → pipecolic acid → 1 indolizidinone	Swainsonine, castanospermine
Pyridine derivatives	Simple derivatives of pyridine	Nicotinic acid → dihydronicotinic acid → 1,2-dihydropyridine	Trigonelline, ricinine, arecoline
Pyridine derivatives	Polycyclic noncondensing pyridine derivatives	Nicotinic acid → dihydronicotinic acid → 1,2-dihydropyridine	Nicotine, nornicotine, anabasine, anatabine
Pyridine derivatives	Polycyclic condensed pyridine derivatives	Nicotinic acid → dihydronicotinic acid → 1,2-dihydropyridine	Actinidine, gentianine, pediculinine
Pyridine derivatives	Sesquiterpene pyridine derivatives	Nicotinic acid, isoleucine	Evonine, hippocrateine, triptonine
Isoquinoline derivatives and related alkaloids	Simple derivatives of isoquinoline	Tyrosine or phenylalanine → dopamine or tyramine (for alkaloids Amarillis)	Salsoline, lophocerine
Isoquinoline derivatives and related alkaloids	Derivatives of 1- and 3-isoquinolines	Tyrosine or phenylalanine → dopamine or tyramine (for alkaloids Amarillis)	N-methylcoridaldine, noroxyhydrastinine
Isoquinoline derivatives and related alkaloids	Derivatives of 1- and 4-phenyltetrahydroisoquinolines	Tyrosine or phenylalanine → dopamine or tyramine (for alkaloids Amarillis)	Cryptostilin
Isoquinoline derivatives and related alkaloids	Derivatives of 5-naftil-isoquinoline	Tyrosine or phenylalanine → dopamine or tyramine (for alkaloids Amarillis)	Ancistrocladine
Isoquinoline derivatives and related alkaloids	Derivatives of 1- and 2-benzyl-izoquinolines	Tyrosine or phenylalanine → dopamine or tyramine (for alkaloids Amarillis)	Papaverine, laudanosine, sendaverine
Isoquinoline derivatives and related alkaloids	Cularine group	Tyrosine or phenylalanine → dopamine or tyramine (for alkaloids Amarillis)	Cularine, yagonine
Isoquinoline derivatives and related alkaloids	Pavines and isopavines	Tyrosine or phenylalanine → dopamine or tyramine (for alkaloids Amarillis)	Argemonine, amurensine
Isoquinoline derivatives and related alkaloids	Benzopyrrocolines	Tyrosine or phenylalanine → dopamine or tyramine (for alkaloids Amarillis)	Cryptaustoline
Isoquinoline derivatives and related alkaloids	Protoberberines	Tyrosine or phenylalanine → dopamine or tyramine (for alkaloids Amarillis)	Berberine, canadine, ophiocarpine, mecambridine, corydaline
Isoquinoline derivatives and related alkaloids	Phthalidisoquinolines	Tyrosine or phenylalanine → dopamine or tyramine (for alkaloids Amarillis)	Hydrastine, narcotine (Noscapine)
Isoquinoline derivatives and related alkaloids	Spirobenzylisoquinolines	Tyrosine or phenylalanine → dopamine or tyramine (for alkaloids Amarillis)	Fumaricine
Isoquinoline derivatives and related alkaloids	Ipecacuanha alkaloids	Tyrosine or phenylalanine → dopamine or tyramine (for alkaloids Amarillis)	Emetine, protoemetine, ipecoside
Isoquinoline derivatives and related alkaloids	Benzophenanthridines	Tyrosine or phenylalanine → dopamine or tyramine (for alkaloids Amarillis)	Sanguinarine, oxynitidine, corynoloxine
Isoquinoline derivatives and related alkaloids	Aporphines	Tyrosine or phenylalanine → dopamine or tyramine (for alkaloids Amarillis)	Glaucine, coridine, liriodenine
Isoquinoline derivatives and related alkaloids	Proaporphines	Tyrosine or phenylalanine → dopamine or tyramine (for alkaloids Amarillis)	Pronuciferine, glaziovine
Isoquinoline derivatives and related alkaloids	Homoaporphines	Tyrosine or phenylalanine → dopamine or tyramine (for alkaloids Amarillis)	Kreysiginine, multifloramine
Isoquinoline derivatives and related alkaloids	Homoproaporphines	Tyrosine or phenylalanine → dopamine or tyramine (for alkaloids Amarillis)	Bulbocodine
Isoquinoline derivatives and related alkaloids	Morphines	Tyrosine or phenylalanine → dopamine or tyramine (for alkaloids Amarillis)	Morphine, codeine, thebaine, sinomenine, heroin
Isoquinoline derivatives and related alkaloids	Homomorphines	Tyrosine or phenylalanine → dopamine or tyramine (for alkaloids Amarillis)	Kreysiginine, androcymbine
Isoquinoline derivatives and related alkaloids	Tropoloisoquinolines	Tyrosine or phenylalanine → dopamine or tyramine (for alkaloids Amarillis)	Imerubrine
Isoquinoline derivatives and related alkaloids	Azofluoranthenes	Tyrosine or phenylalanine → dopamine or tyramine (for alkaloids Amarillis)	Rufescine, imeluteine
Isoquinoline derivatives and related alkaloids	Amaryllis alkaloids	Tyrosine or phenylalanine → dopamine or tyramine (for alkaloids Amarillis)	Lycorine, ambelline, tazettine, galantamine, montanine
Isoquinoline derivatives and related alkaloids	Erythrina alkaloids	Tyrosine or phenylalanine → dopamine or tyramine (for alkaloids Amarillis)	Erysodine, erythroidine
Isoquinoline derivatives and related alkaloids	Phenanthrene derivatives	Tyrosine or phenylalanine → dopamine or tyramine (for alkaloids Amarillis)	Atherosperminine
Isoquinoline derivatives and related alkaloids	Protopines	Tyrosine or phenylalanine → dopamine or tyramine (for alkaloids Amarillis)	Protopine, oxomuramine, corycavidine
Isoquinoline derivatives and related alkaloids	Aristolactam	Tyrosine or phenylalanine → dopamine or tyramine (for alkaloids Amarillis)	Doriflavin
Oxazole derivatives		Tyrosine → tyramine	Annuloline, halfordinol, texaline, texamine
Isoxazole derivatives		Ibotenic acid → Muscimol	Ibotenic acid, Muscimol
Thiazole derivatives		1-Deoxy-D-xylulose 5-phosphate (DOXP), tyrosine, cysteine	Nostocyclamide, thiostreptone
Quinazoline derivatives	3,4-Dihydro-4-quinazolone derivatives	Anthranilic acid or phenylalanine or ornithine	Febrifugine
Quinazoline derivatives	1,4-Dihydro-4-quinazolone derivatives	Anthranilic acid or phenylalanine or ornithine	Glycorine, arborine, glycosminine
Quinazoline derivatives	Pyrrolidine and piperidine quinazoline derivatives	Anthranilic acid or phenylalanine or ornithine	Vazicine (peganine)
Acridine derivatives		Anthranilic acid	Rutacridone, acronicine
Quinoline derivatives	Simple derivatives of quinoline derivatives of 2–quinolones and 4-quinolone	Anthranilic acid → 3-carboxyquinoline	Cusparine, echinopsine, evocarpine
Quinoline derivatives	Tricyclic terpenoids	Anthranilic acid → 3-carboxyquinoline	Flindersine
Quinoline derivatives	Furanoquinoline derivatives	Anthranilic acid → 3-carboxyquinoline	Dictamnine, fagarine, skimmianine
Quinoline derivatives	Quinines	Tryptophan → tryptamine → strictosidine (with secologanin) → korinanteal → cinhoninon	Quinine, quinidine, cinchonine, cinhonidine
Indole derivatives	Non-isoprene indole alkaloids		
Indole derivatives	Simple indole derivatives	Tryptophan → tryptamine or 5-Hydroxytryptophan	Serotonin, psilocybin, dimethyltryptamine (DMT), bufotenin
Indole derivatives	Simple derivatives of β-carboline	Tryptophan → tryptamine or 5-Hydroxytryptophan	Harman, harmine, harmaline, eleagnine
Indole derivatives	Pyrroloindole alkaloids	Tryptophan → tryptamine or 5-Hydroxytryptophan	Physostigmine (eserine), etheramine, physovenine, eptastigmine
Indole derivatives	Semiterpenoid indole alkaloids		
Indole derivatives	Ergot alkaloids	Tryptophan → chanoclavine → agroclavine → elimoclavine → paspalic acid → lysergic acid	Ergotamine, ergobasine, ergosine
Indole derivatives	Monoterpenoid indole alkaloids		
Indole derivatives	Corynanthe type alkaloids	Tryptophan → tryptamine → strictosidine (with secologanin)	Ajmalicine, sarpagine, vobasine, ajmaline, yohimbine, reserpine, mitragynine, group strychnine and (Strychnine brucine, aquamicine, vomicine)
Indole derivatives	Iboga-type alkaloids	Tryptophan → tryptamine → strictosidine (with secologanin)	Ibogamine, ibogaine, voacangine
Indole derivatives	Aspidosperma-type alkaloids	Tryptophan → tryptamine → strictosidine (with secologanin)	Vincamine, vinca alkaloids, vincotine, aspidospermine
Imidazole derivatives		Directly from histidine	Histamine, pilocarpine, pilosine, stevensine
Purine derivatives		Xanthosine (formed in purine biosynthesis) → 7 methylxantosine → 7-methylxanthine → theobromine → caffeine	Caffeine, theobromine, theophylline, saxitoxin
Alkaloids with nitrogen in the side chain (protoalkaloids)
β-Phenylethylamine derivatives		Tyrosine or phenylalanine → dioxyphenilalanine → dopamine → adrenaline and mescaline tyrosine → tyramine phenylalanine → 1-phenylpropane-1,2-dione → cathinone → ephedrine and pseudoephedrine	Tyramine, ephedrine, pseudoephedrine, mescaline, cathinone, catecholamines (adrenaline, noradrenaline, dopamine)
Colchicine alkaloids		Tyrosine or phenylalanine → dopamine → autumnaline → colchicine	Colchicine, colchamine
Muscarine		Glutamic acid → 3-ketoglutamic acid → muscarine (with pyruvic acid)	Muscarine, allomuscarine, epimuscarine, epiallomuscarine
Benzylamine		Phenylalanine with valine, leucine or isoleucine	Capsaicin, dihydrocapsaicin, nordihydrocapsaicin, vanillylamine
Polyamines alkaloids
Putrescine derivatives		ornithine → putrescine → spermidine → spermine	Paucine
Spermidine derivatives		ornithine → putrescine → spermidine → spermine	Lunarine, codonocarpine
Spermine derivatives		ornithine → putrescine → spermidine → spermine	Verbascenine, aphelandrine
Peptide (cyclopeptide) alkaloids
Peptide alkaloids with a 13-membered cycle	Nummularine C type	From different amino acids	Nummularine C, Nummularine S
Peptide alkaloids with a 13-membered cycle	Ziziphine type	From different amino acids	Ziziphine A, sativanine H
Peptide alkaloids with a 14-membered cycle	Frangulanine type	From different amino acids	Frangulanine, scutianine J
Peptide alkaloids with a 14-membered cycle	Scutianine A type	From different amino acids	Scutianine A
Peptide alkaloids with a 14-membered cycle	Integerrine type	From different amino acids	Integerrine, discarine D
Peptide alkaloids with a 14-membered cycle	Amphibine F type	From different amino acids	Amphibine F, spinanine A
Peptide alkaloids with a 14-membered cycle	Amfibine B type	From different amino acids	Amphibine B, lotusine C
Peptide alkaloids with a 15-membered cycle	Mucronine A type	From different amino acids	Mucronine A
Pseudoalkaloids (terpenes and steroids)
Diterpenes	Lycoctonine type	Mevalonic acid → Isopentenyl pyrophosphate → geranyl pyrophosphate	Aconitine, delphinine
Steroidal alkaloids		Cholesterol, arginine	Solanidine, cyclopamine, batrachotoxin

== Properties ==
Most alkaloids contain oxygen in their molecular structure; those compounds are usually colorless crystals at ambient conditions. Oxygen-free alkaloids, such as nicotine or coniine, are typically volatile, colorless, oily liquids. Some alkaloids are colored, like berberine (yellow) and sanguinarine (orange).

Most alkaloids are weak bases, but some, such as theobromine and theophylline, are amphoteric. Many alkaloids dissolve poorly in water but readily dissolve in organic solvents, such as diethyl ether, chloroform or 1,2-dichloroethane. Caffeine, cocaine, codeine and nicotine are slightly soluble in water (with a solubility of ≥1g/L), whereas others, including morphine and yohimbine are very slightly water-soluble (0.1–1 g/L). Alkaloids and acids form salts of various strengths. These salts are usually freely soluble in water and ethanol and poorly soluble in most organic solvents. Exceptions include scopolamine hydrobromide, which is soluble in organic solvents, and the water-soluble quinine sulfate.

Most alkaloids have a bitter taste or are poisonous when ingested. Alkaloid production in plants appeared to have evolved in response to feeding by herbivorous animals; however, some animals have evolved the ability to detoxify alkaloids. Some alkaloids can produce developmental defects in the offspring of animals that consume but cannot detoxify the alkaloids. One example is the alkaloid cyclopamine, produced in the leaves of corn lily. During the 1950s, up to 25% of lambs born by sheep that had grazed on corn lily had serious facial deformations. These ranged from deformed jaws to cyclopia. After decades of research, in the 1980s, the compound responsible for these deformities was identified as the alkaloid 11-deoxyjervine, later renamed to cyclopamine.

== Distribution in nature ==
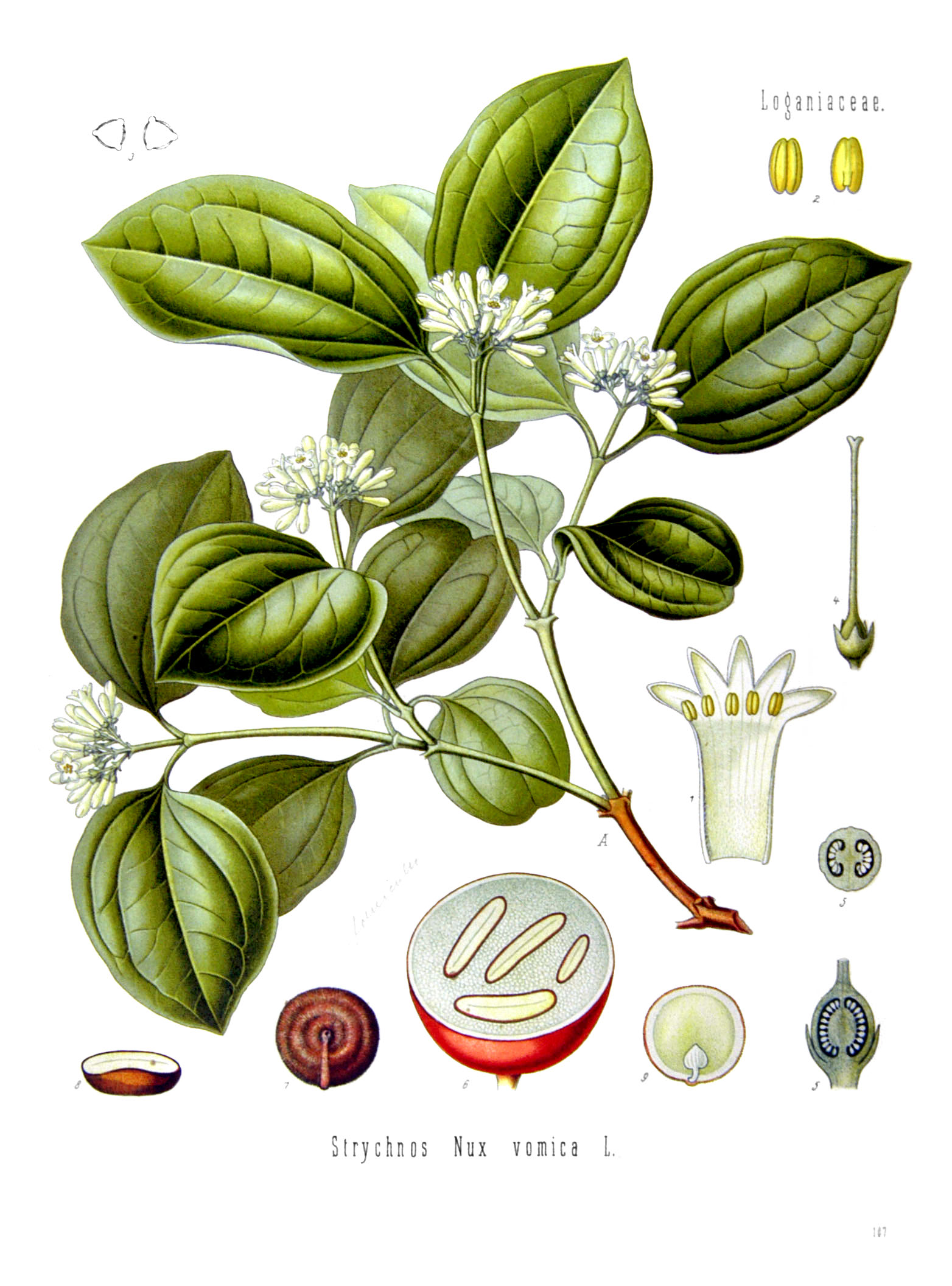
Strychnine tree. Its seeds are rich in strychnine and brucine.

Alkaloids are generated by various living organisms, especially by higher plants – about 10 to 25% of those contain alkaloids. Therefore, in the past the term "alkaloid" was associated with plants.

The alkaloids content in plants is usually within a few percent and is inhomogeneous over the plant tissues. Depending on the type of plants, the maximum concentration is observed in the leaves (for example, black henbane), fruits or seeds (Strychnine tree), root (Rauvolfia serpentina) or bark (cinchona). Furthermore, different tissues of the same plants may contain different alkaloids.

Beside plants, alkaloids are found in certain types of fungus, such as psilocybin in the fruiting bodies of the genus Psilocybe, and in animals, such as bufotenin in the skin of some toads and a number of insects, markedly ants. Some amines, such as adrenaline and serotonin, which play an important role in higher animals, are similar to alkaloids in their structure and biosynthesis and are sometimes called alkaloids.

=== Marine alkaloids ===
Marine alkaloids are extracted from marine organisms living in oceans, including animals, plants, certain marine bacteria and marine fungi. They are characterized in their chemical structure by halogens, which are atypical of higher organisms and terrestrial plants.

Tetrodotoxin produced by the pufferfish and blue-ringed octopus, but occurs in 140 animal species worldwide. Although numerous theories address the origin of tetrodotoxin, the involvement of endogenous symbiotic bacteria producing toxins is prevalent.

== Extraction ==
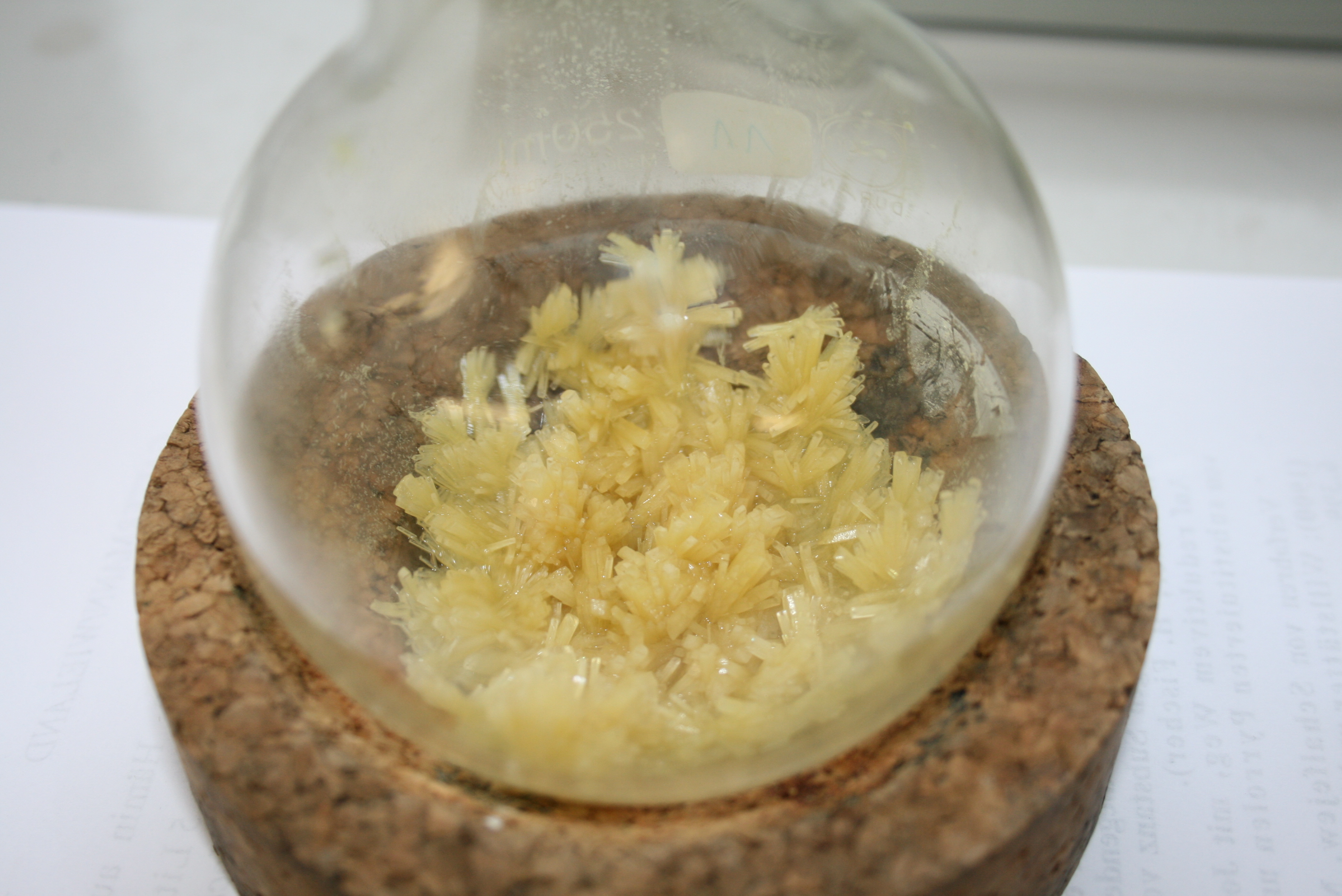
Crystals of piperine extracted from black pepper.

Because of the structural diversity of alkaloids, there is no single method of their extraction from natural raw materials. Most methods exploit the property of most alkaloids to be soluble in organic solvents but not in water, and the opposite tendency of their salts.

Most plants contain several alkaloids. Their mixture is extracted first and then individual alkaloids are separated. Plants are thoroughly ground before extraction. Most alkaloids are present in the raw plants in the form of salts of organic acids. The extracted alkaloids may remain salts or change into bases. Base extraction is achieved by processing the raw material with alkaline solutions and extracting the alkaloid bases with organic solvents, such as 1,2-dichloroethane, chloroform, diethyl ether or benzene. Then, the impurities are dissolved by weak acids; this converts alkaloid bases into salts that are washed away with water. If necessary, an aqueous solution of alkaloid salts is again made alkaline and treated with an organic solvent. The process is repeated until the desired purity is achieved.

In the acidic extraction, the raw plant material is processed by a weak acidic solution (e.g., acetic acid in water, ethanol, or methanol). A base is then added to convert alkaloids to basic forms that are extracted with organic solvent (if the extraction was performed with alcohol, it is removed first, and the remainder is dissolved in water). The solution is purified as described above.

Alkaloids are separated from their mixture using their different solubility in certain solvents and different reactivity with certain reagents or by distillation.

A number of alkaloids are identified from insects, among which the fire ant venom alkaloids known as solenopsins have received greater attention from researchers. These insect alkaloids can be efficiently extracted by solvent immersion of live fire ants or by centrifugation of live ants followed by silica-gel chromatography purification. Tracking and dosing the extracted solenopsin ant alkaloids has been described as possible based on their absorbance peak around 232 nanometers.

== Biosynthesis ==
Biological precursors of most alkaloids are amino acids, such as ornithine, lysine, phenylalanine, tyrosine, tryptophan, histidine, aspartic acid, and anthranilic acid. Nicotinic acid can be synthesized from tryptophan or aspartic acid. Ways of alkaloid biosynthesis are too numerous and cannot be easily classified. However, there are a few typical reactions involved in the biosynthesis of various classes of alkaloids, including synthesis of Schiff bases and Mannich reaction.

=== Synthesis of Schiff bases ===
Schiff bases can be obtained by reacting amines with ketones or aldehydes. These reactions are a common method of producing C=N bonds.

In the biosynthesis of alkaloids, such reactions may take place within a molecule, such as in the synthesis of piperidine:

=== Mannich reaction ===
An integral component of the Mannich reaction, in addition to an amine and a carbonyl compound, is a carbanion, which plays the role of the nucleophile in the nucleophilic addition to the ion formed by the reaction of the amine and the carbonyl.

The Mannich reaction can proceed both intermolecularly and intramolecularly:

== Dimer alkaloids ==
In addition to the described above monomeric alkaloids, there are also dimeric, and even trimeric and tetrameric alkaloids formed upon condensation of two, three, and four monomeric alkaloids. Dimeric alkaloids are usually formed from monomers of the same type through the following mechanisms:

- Mannich reaction, resulting in, e.g., voacamine
- Michael reaction (villalstonine)
- Condensation of aldehydes with amines (toxiferine)
- Oxidative addition of phenols (dauricine, tubocurarine)
- Lactonization (carpaine).
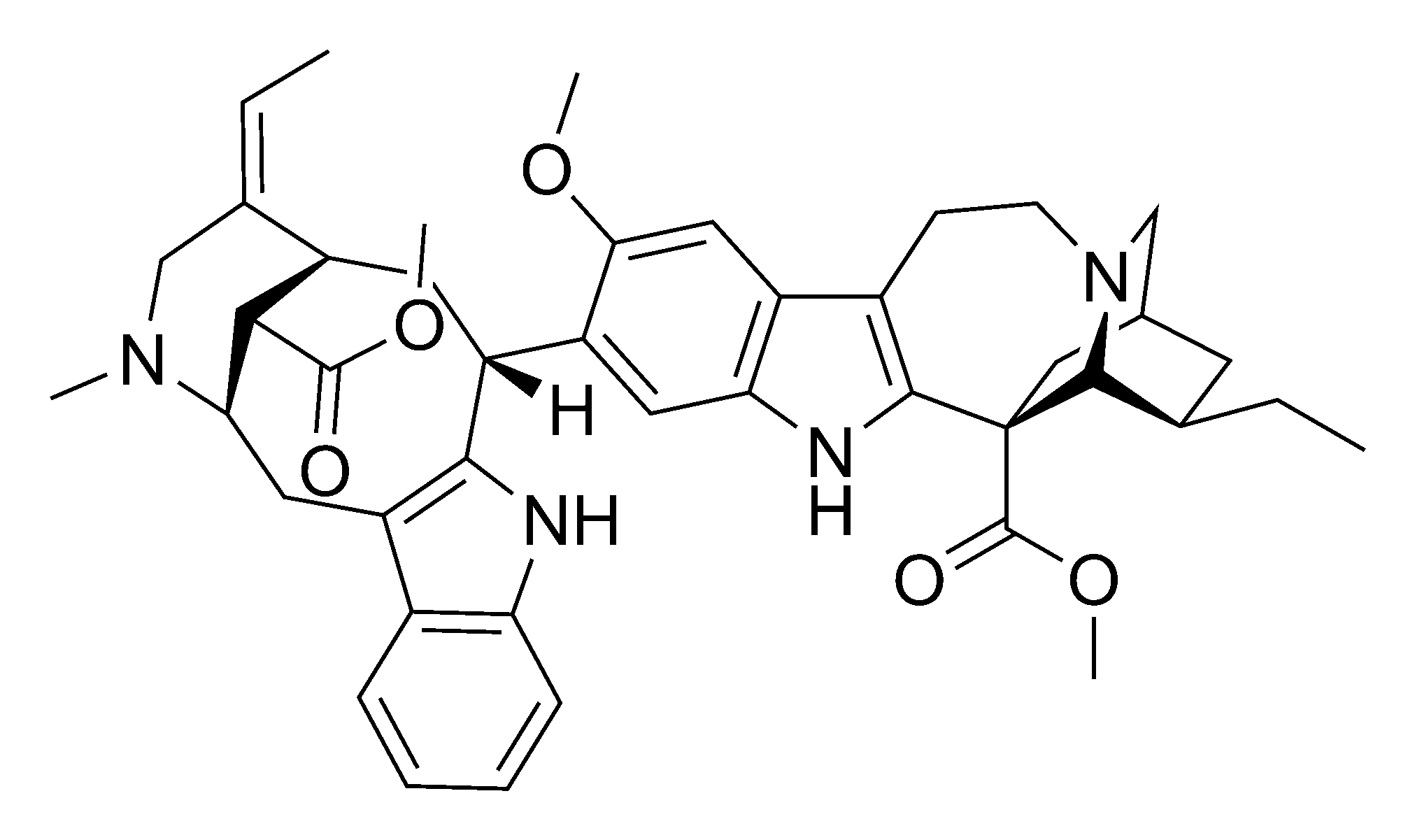
Voacamine

Villalstonine

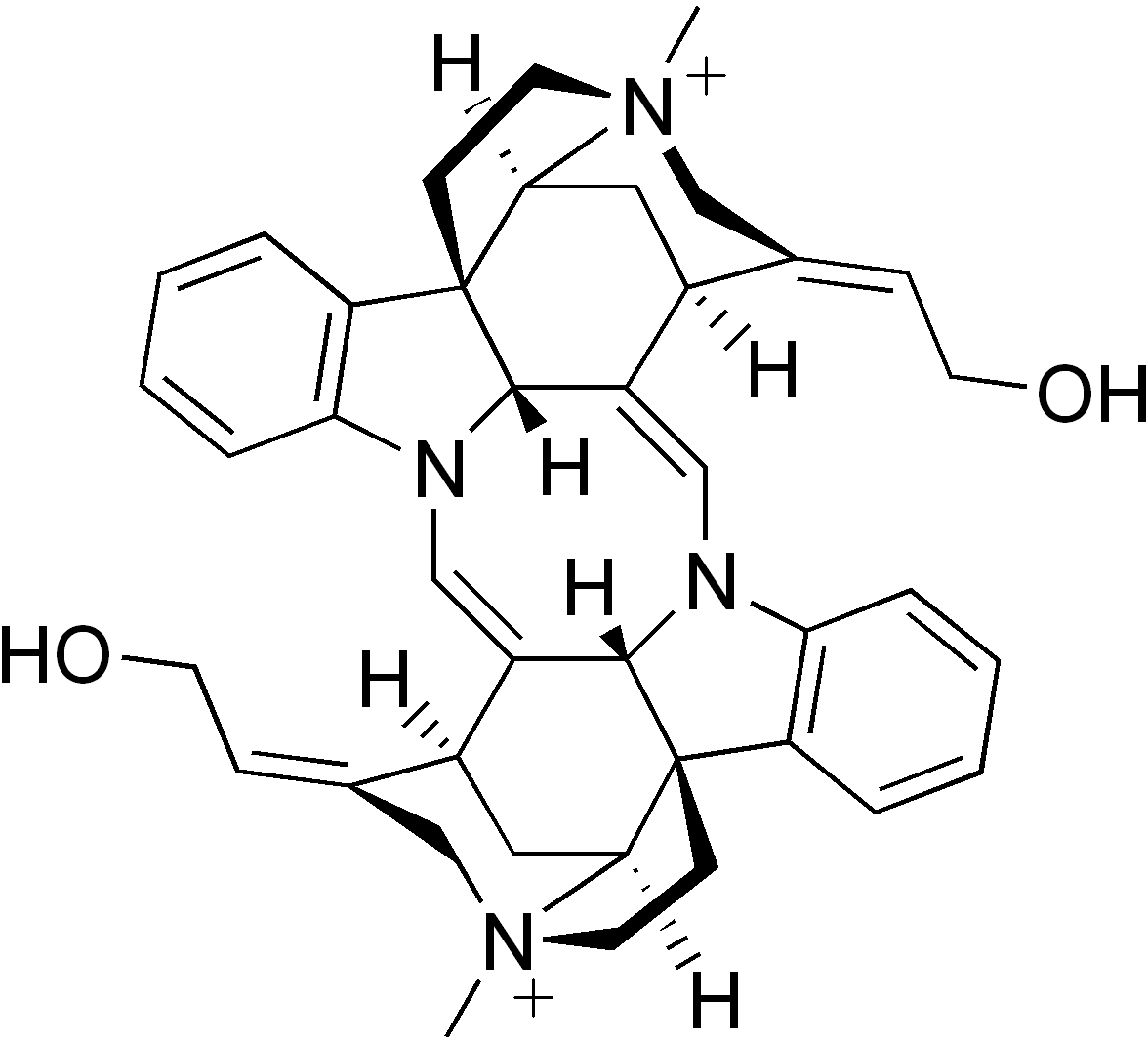
Toxiferine

Dauricine

Tubocurarine

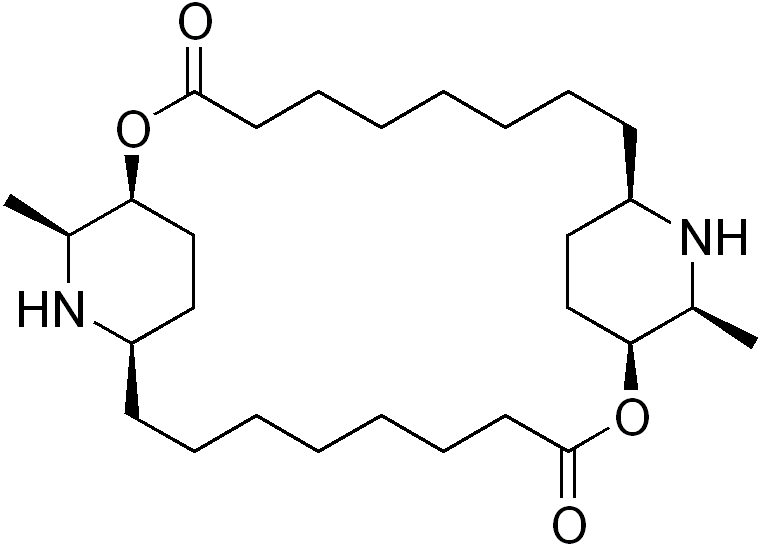
Carpaine

There are also dimeric alkaloids formed from two distinct monomers, such as the vinca alkaloids vinblastine and vincristine, which are formed from the coupling of catharanthine and vindoline. The newer semi-synthetic chemotherapeutic agent vinorelbine is used in the treatment of non-small-cell lung cancer. It is another derivative dimer of vindoline and catharanthine and is synthesised from anhydrovinblastine, starting either from leurosine or the monomers themselves.

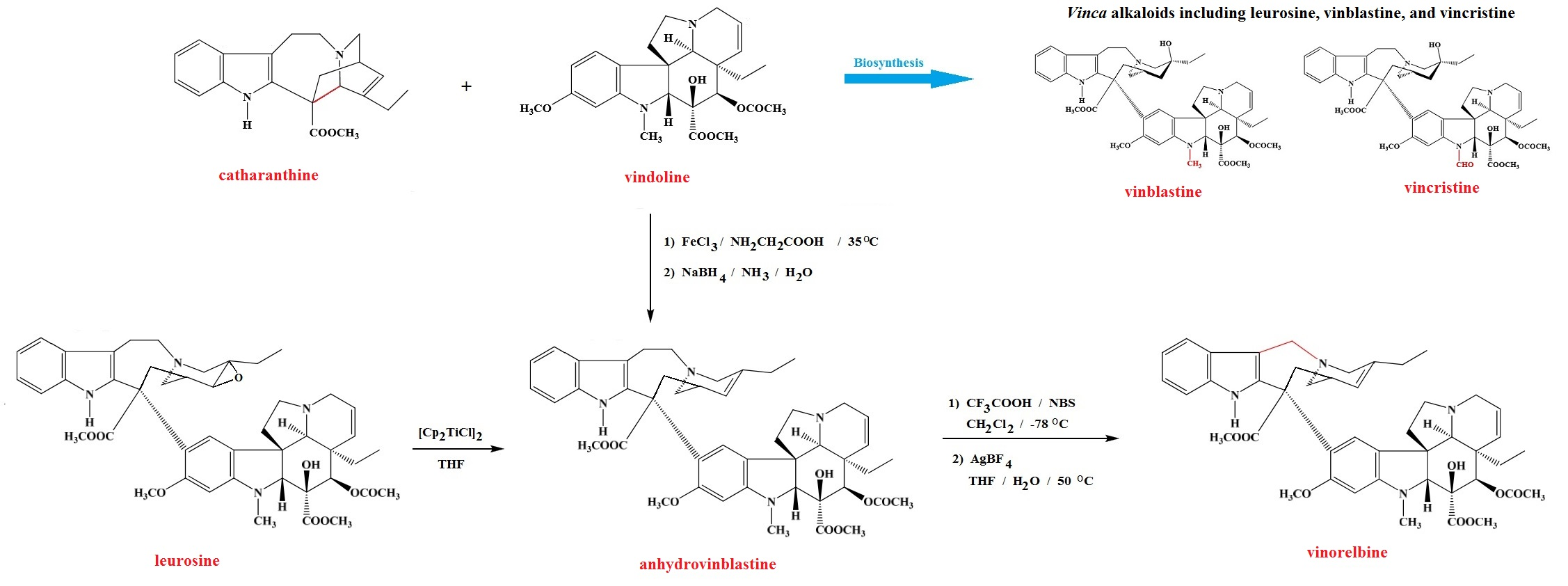

== Biological role ==
Alkaloids are among the most important and best-known secondary metabolites, i.e. biogenic substances not directly involved in the normal growth, development, or reproduction of the organism. Instead, they generally mediate ecological interactions, which may produce a selective advantage for the organism by increasing its survivability or fecundity. In some cases their function, if any, remains unclear. An early hypothesis, that alkaloids are the final products of nitrogen metabolism in plants, as urea and uric acid are in mammals, was refuted by the finding that their concentration fluctuates rather than steadily increasing.

Most of the known functions of alkaloids are related to protection. For example, aporphine alkaloid liriodenine produced by the tulip tree protects it from parasitic mushrooms. In addition, the presence of alkaloids in the plant prevents insects and chordate animals from eating it. However, some animals are adapted to alkaloids and even use them in their own metabolism. Such alkaloid-related substances as serotonin, dopamine and histamine are important neurotransmitters in animals. Alkaloids are also known to regulate plant growth. One example of an organism that uses alkaloids for protection is the Utetheisa ornatrix, more commonly known as the ornate moth. Pyrrolizidine alkaloids render these larvae and adult moths unpalatable to many of their natural enemies like coccinelid beetles, green lacewings, insectivorous hemiptera and insectivorous bats. Another example of alkaloids being utilized occurs in the poison hemlock moth (Agonopterix alstroemeriana). This moth feeds on its highly toxic and alkaloid-rich host plant poison hemlock (Conium maculatum) during its larval stage. A. alstroemeriana may benefit twofold from the toxicity of the naturally occurring alkaloids, both through the unpalatability of the species to predators and through the ability of A. alstroemeriana to recognize Conium maculatum as the correct location for oviposition. A fire ant venom alkaloid known as solenopsin has been demonstrated to protect queens of invasive fire ants during the foundation of new nests, thus playing a central role in the spread of this pest ant species around the world.

== Applications ==
=== In medicine ===
Medical use of alkaloid-containing plants has a long history, and, thus, when the first alkaloids were isolated in the 19th century, they immediately found application in clinical practice. Many alkaloids are still used in medicine, usually in the form of salts widely used including the following:

Alkaloid	Action
Ajmaline	Antiarrhythmic
Emetine	Antiprotozoal agent, emesis
Ergot alkaloids	Vasoconstriction, hallucinogenic, Uterotonic
Glaucine	Antitussive
Morphine	Analgesic
Nicotine	Stimulant, nicotinic acetylcholine receptor agonist
Physostigmine	Inhibitor of acetylcholinesterase
Quinidine	Antiarrhythmic
Quinine	Antipyretic, antimalarial
Reserpine	Antihypertensive
Tubocurarine	Muscle relaxant
Vinblastine, vincristine	Antitumor
Vincamine	Vasodilating, antihypertensive
Yohimbine	Stimulant, aphrodisiac
Berberine	Antihyperglycaemic

Many synthetic and semisynthetic drugs are structural modifications of the alkaloids, which were designed to enhance or change the primary effect of the drug and reduce unwanted side-effects. For example, naloxone, an opioid receptor antagonist, is a derivative of thebaine that is present in opium.

Thebaine

Naloxone

=== In agriculture ===
Prior to the development of a wide range of relatively low-toxic synthetic pesticides, some alkaloids, such as salts of nicotine and anabasine, were used as insecticides. Their use was limited by their high toxicity to humans.

=== Use as psychoactive drugs ===
Preparations of plants and fungi containing alkaloids and their extracts, and later pure alkaloids, have long been used as psychoactive substances. Cocaine, caffeine, and cathinone are stimulants of the central nervous system. Mescaline and many indole alkaloids (such as psilocybin, dimethyltryptamine and ibogaine) have hallucinogenic effect. Morphine and codeine are strong narcotic pain killers.

There are alkaloids that do not have strong psychoactive effect themselves, but are precursors for semi-synthetic psychoactive drugs. For example, ephedrine and pseudoephedrine are used to produce methcathinone and methamphetamine. Thebaine is used in the synthesis of many painkillers such as oxycodone.

== See also ==
- Amine
- Base (chemistry)
- List of poisonous plants
- Mayer's reagent
- Natural products
- Palau'amine
- Secondary metabolite

== General sources ==
- Aniszewski, Tadeusz (2007). Alkaloids: secrets of life. Amsterdam: Elsevier. ISBN 978-0-444-52736-3.
- Begley, Tadhg P. (2009). Encyclopedia of Chemical Biology. Vol. 10. Wiley. pp. 1569–1570. doi:10.1002/cbic.200900262. ISBN 978-0-471-75477-0.
- Brossi, Arnold (1989). The Alkaloids: Chemistry and Pharmacology. Academic Press.
- Dewick, Paul M. (2002). Medicinal Natural Products: A Biosynthetic Approach (Second ed.). Wiley. ISBN 978-0-471-49640-3.
- Fattorusso, E.; Taglialatela-Scafati, O. (2008). Modern Alkaloids: Structure, Isolation, Synthesis and Biology. Wiley-VCH. ISBN 978-3-527-31521-5.
- Grinkevich NI; Safronich LN, eds. (1983). The chemical analysis of medicinal plants (in Russian). Moscow: Vysshaya Shkola.
- Hesse, Manfred (2002). Alkaloids: Nature's Curse or Blessing?. Wiley-VCH. ISBN 978-3-906390-24-6.
- Knunyants, IL (1988). Chemical Encyclopedia. Soviet Encyclopedia.
- Orekhov, AP (1955). Chemistry alkaloids (Acad. 2nd ed.). Moscow.
- Plemenkov, VV (2001). Introduction to the Chemistry of Natural Compounds. Kazan.
- Saxton, J. E. (1971). The Alkaloids: A Specialist Periodical Report. London: The Chemical Society.
- Veselovskaya, N. B.; Kovalenko, A. E. (2000). Drugs. Moscow: Triada-X.
- Wink, M (2009). "Mode of action and toxicology of plant toxins and poisonous plants". Mitt. Julius Kühn-Inst. 421: 93–112x.
