= Imidazole alkaloids =

Class of chemical compounds

Imidazole, the basic structure of imidazole alkaloids

Imidazole alkaloids are a group of alkaloids whose basic structure contains the imidazole ring system.

== Occurrence ==
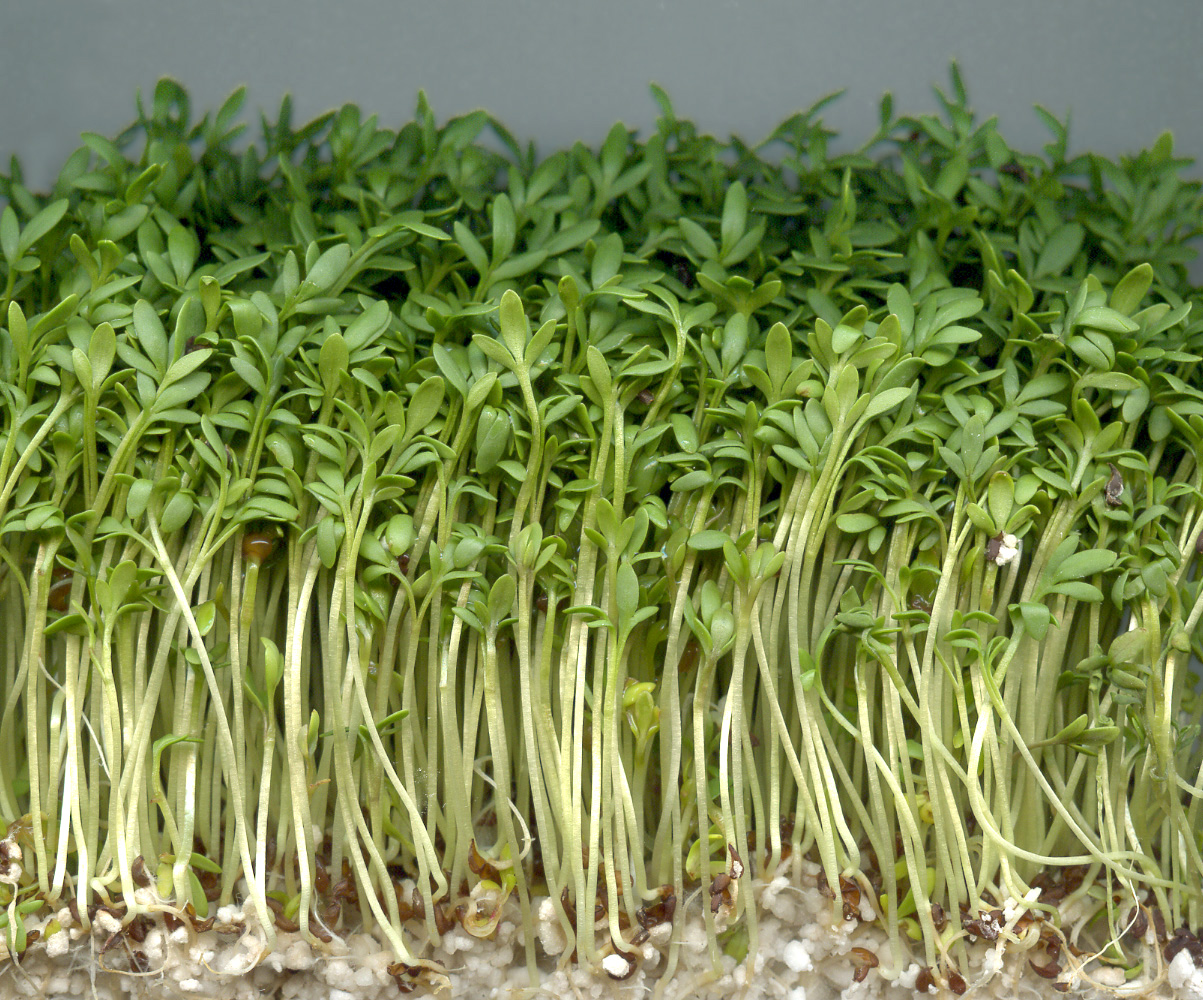
Garden cress seedlings

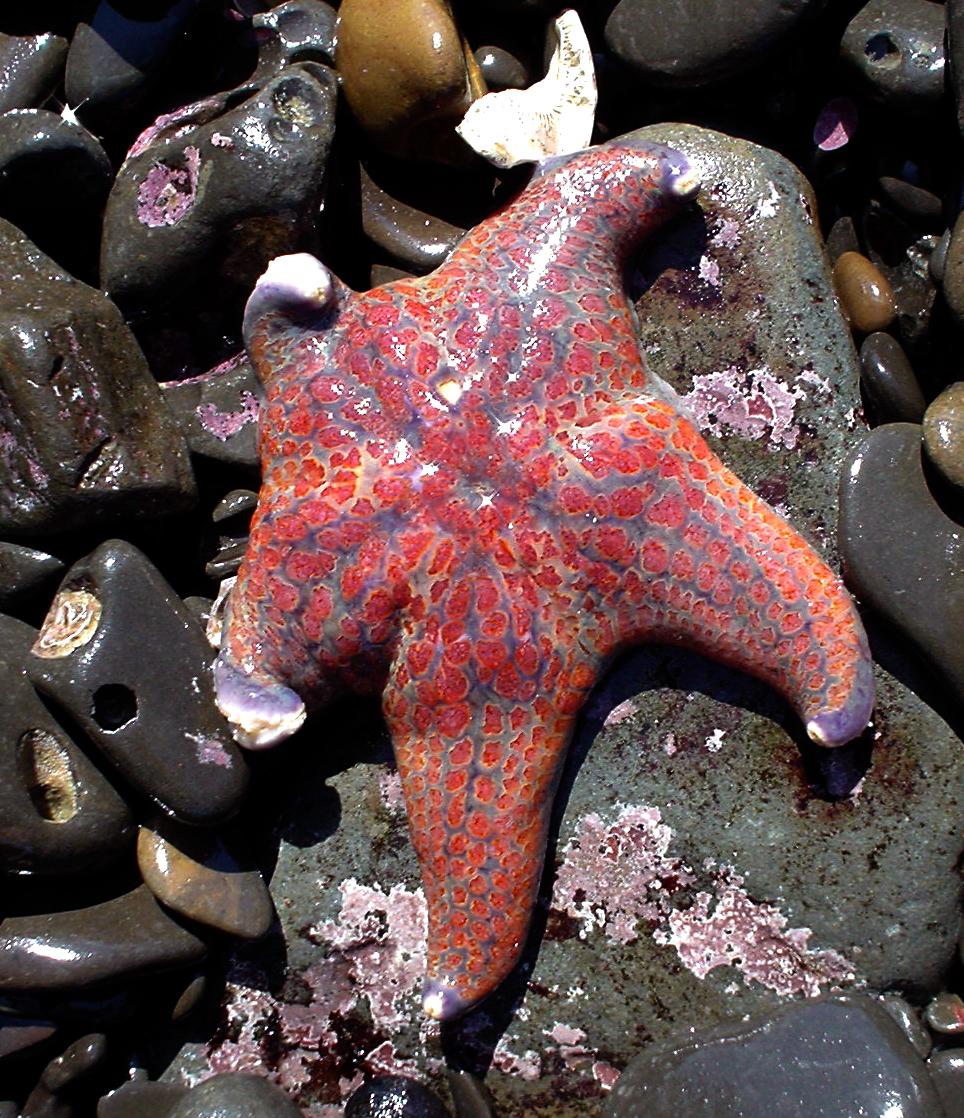
Dermasterias imbricata

In nature, imidazole alkaloids are found both as secondary plant compounds and as byproducts of histidine metabolism in marine organisms. One well-known imidazole alkaloid is pilocarpine, which is present in the leaves of Paraguay jaborandi.

For instance, from the seeds of garden cress (Lepidium sativum), various monomeric imidazole alkaloids can be isolated, including semilepidinoside A and semilepidinoside B, as well as dimeric forms such as lepidins B, C, D, E, and F. In the sponge Leucetta chagosensis, a variety of imidazole alkaloids, such as 2-deoxy-2-aminokealiiquinone and Naamine C, have been identified. Imbricatin has been isolated from the starfish Dermasterias imbricata, while martensin A has been obtained from the red alga Martensia fragilis. Notably, the marine sponge Pseudaxinyssa contains odilin.

The Maca plant contains relevant amounts of lepidilin.

== Representative ==
A well-known imidazole alkaloid is pilocarpine. Other representatives include. cynodin, cynometrin and odilin.

(+)-Pilocarpine

Cynodine

Cynometrine

Odiline

== Websites ==
- Imidazole Alkaloids. In Encyclopedia of Biochemistry, at spektrum.de. Retrieved September 29, 2019.
