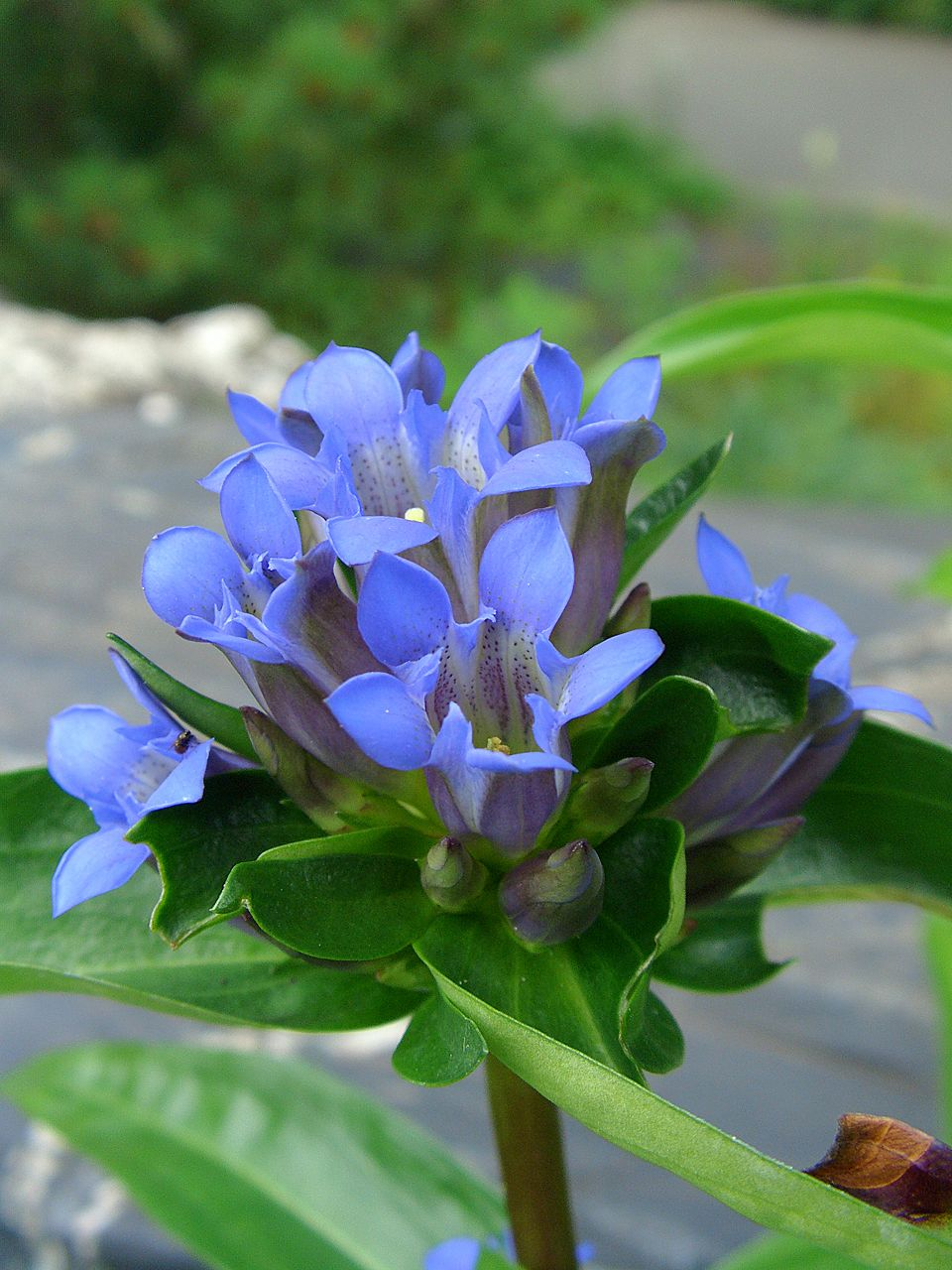

Scientific classification
- Kingdom: Plantae
- Clade: Embryophytes
- Clade: Tracheophytes
- Clade: Spermatophytes
- Clade: Angiosperms
- Clade: Eudicots
- Clade: Asterids
- Order: Gentianales
- Family: Gentianaceae
- Genus: Gentiana
- Species: G. macrophylla

Binomial name
- Gentiana macrophylla Pall.

Synonyms
- Gentiana straminea; Gentiana crassiaulisor; Gentiana dahurica

= Gentiana macrophylla =

Large leaf gentian

Species of flowering plant in the gentian family

Gentiana macrophylla, the large leaf gentian, is called qin jiao(秦艽) in Chinese. Synonyms include G. straminea, G. crassiaulisor, and G. dahurica. It is found in China, Kazakhstan, Mongolia and Russia.

== Chemistry ==
Chemical constituents include gentianine, gentianidine, gentiopicroside, and gentianol.

== Gallery ==
Gentiopicroside (gentiopicrin), a selected constituent of Gentiana

Gentianine
