= Stevensine =

Alkaloid isolated from a marine sponge

Names
- Preferred IUPAC name 4-(2-Amino-1H-imidazol-5-yl)-2,3-dibromo-6,7-dihydropyrrolo[2,3-c]azepin-8(1H)-one
- Other names Odiline

Identifiers
CAS Number	99102-22-4
3D model (JSmol)	Interactive image
ChemSpider	9178773
PubChem CID	11003581
UNII	44PB7HEQ22
CompTox Dashboard (EPA)	DTXSID50451503
- InChI: InChI=1S/C11H9Br2N5O/c12-7-6-4(5-3-16-11(14)17-5)1-2-15-10(19)8(6)18-9(7)13/h1,3,18H,2H2,(H,15,19)(H3,14,16,17) Key: ZNIBKSGUBSYKLY-UHFFFAOYSA-N
- SMILES: C1C=C(C2=C(C(=O)N1)NC(=C2Br)Br)C3=CN=C(N3)N

Properties
Chemical formula	C_{11}H_{9}Br_{2}N_{5}O
Molar mass	387.035 g·mol^{−1}
- Except where otherwise noted, data are given for materials in their standard state (at 25 °C [77 °F], 100 kPa). Infobox references

Stevensine is a bromopyrrole alkaloid originally isolated from an unidentified Micronesian marine sponge, as well as the known sponge species, Pseudaxinyssa cantharella and Axinella corrugata. Total synthesis of stevensine has been achieved by Ying-zi Xu et al., and investigations into the biosynthetic origin has been explored by Paul Andrade et al. Understanding methods to synthesize stevensine and other similar compounds is an important step to accomplish, as marine sponges contain numerous biologically active metabolites that have been shown to function as anything from antitumor to antibacterial agents when tested for medicinal applications. Reasons for why marine sponges contain so many bio-active chemicals has been attributed to their sessile nature, and the need to produce chemical defenses to ensure survival. However, since many of these compounds naturally occur in small amounts, harvesting the sponges has in the past led to near-extinction of some species.

The bioactive nature of stevensine has been explored both as to its evolutionary purpose as well as potential medicinal uses. At its natural concentrations in vivo, stevensine, as well as other secondary metabolite bromopyrroles from sponges have been shown to function as anti-feeding agents against predatory fish such as bluehead wrasse (Thalassoma bifasciatum). Stevensine is present in marine sponges in concentrations of approximately 19 mg/mL, but have been shown to deter feeding in a laboratory setting in concentrations as low as 2.25 mg/mL, while deterring in the field requires as much as 12 mg/mL. In vitro tests have shown that this compound functions as an antimicrobial agent, giving promise for this compound to be used as a potential drug, however it does not lower the activity of methicillin-resistant Staphylococcus aureus (MRSA), while related compounds isolated from sponges such as bromoageliferin do.
