= Villalstonine =

Identifiers
CAS Number	2723-56-0
3D model (JSmol)	Interactive image
ChEBI	CHEBI:141961
ChemSpider	4584738
PubChem CID	5476353
CompTox Dashboard (EPA)	DTXSID801336397
- InChI: InChI=1/C41H48N4O4/c1-6-23-21-44-16-15-40-20-30-26-17-34-36-27(24-11-7-9-13-31(24)43(36)4)18-33(42(34)3)28(26)22-48-39(30,2)49-41(40)35(44)19-25(23)37(38(46)47-5)45(41)32-14-10-8-12-29(32)40/h6-14,25-26,28,30,33-35,37H,15-22H2,1-5H3/b23-6+ Key: XXNYZYBYNFRERU-TXNBCWFRSA-N
- SMILES: C/C=C/1\CN2CCC34CC5C6CC7C8=C(CC(C6COC5(OC39C2CC1C(N9C1=CC=CC=C41)C(=O)OC)C)N7C)C1=CC=CC=C1N8C

Properties
Chemical formula	C_{41}H_{48}N_{4}O_{4}
Molar mass	660.859 g·mol^{−1}
- Except where otherwise noted, data are given for materials in their standard state (at 25 °C [77 °F], 100 kPa). Infobox references

Villalstonine is a bisindole alkaloid isolated from Alstonia with in vitro antiplasmodial activity.
