= Carpaine =

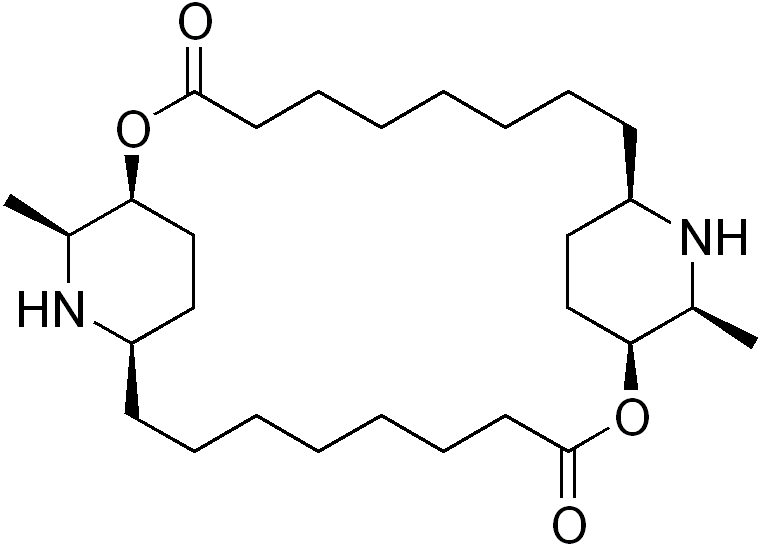

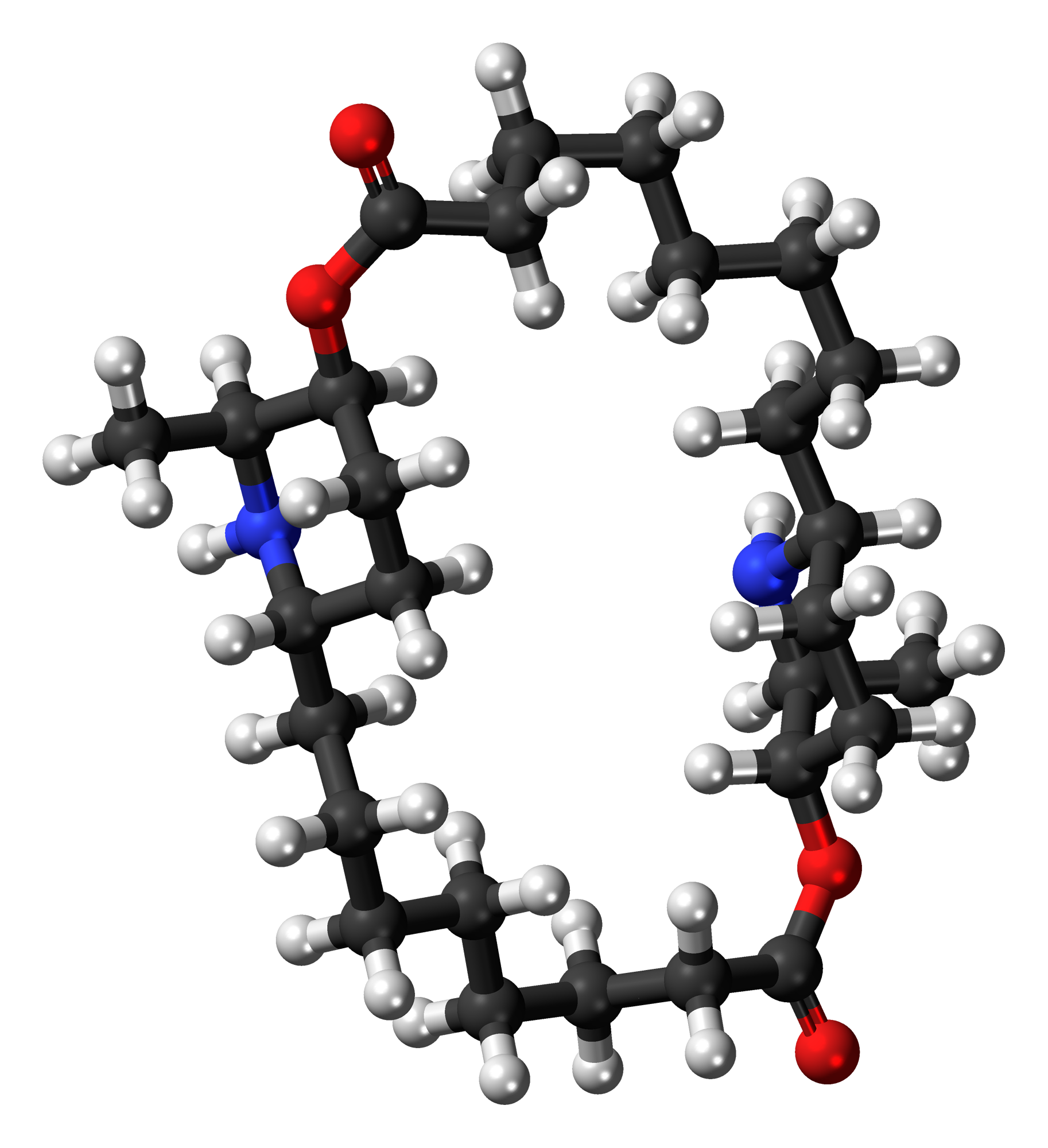

Names
- IUPAC name (1S,11R,13S,14S,24R,26S)-13,26-Dimethyl-2,15-dioxa-12,25-diazatricyclo[22.2.2.211,14]triacontane-3,16-dione
- Other names (+)-Carpaine

Identifiers
CAS Number	3463-92-1
3D model (JSmol)	Interactive image
ChEBI	CHEBI:3433
ChemSpider	390994
ECHA InfoCard	100.020.378
PubChem CID	442630
UNII	VLR223H4QP
- InChI: InChI=1S/C28H50N2O4/c1-21-25-19-17-23(29-21)13-9-5-3-8-12-16-28(32)34-26-20-18-24(30-22(26)2)14-10-6-4-7-11-15-27(31)33-25/h21-26,29-30H,3-20H2,1-2H3/t21-,22-,23+,24+,25-,26-/m0/s1 Key: AMSCMASJCYVAIF-QCVMBYIASA-N; InChI=1/C28H50N2O4/c1-21-25-19-17-23(29-21)13-9-5-3-8-12-16-28(32)34-26-20-18-24(30-22(26)2)14-10-6-4-7-11-15-27(31)33-25/h21-26,29-30H,3-20H2,1-2H3/t21-,22-,23+,24+,25-,26-/m0/s1 Key: AMSCMASJCYVAIF-QCVMBYIABP
- SMILES: O=C3O[C@H]1CC[C@H](N[C@H]1C)CCCCCCCC(=O)O[C@@H]2[C@@H](N[C@@H](CC2)CCCCCCC3)C

Properties
Chemical formula	C_{28}H_{50}N_{2}O_{4}
Molar mass	478.70 g/mol
Melting point	121 °C
- Except where otherwise noted, data are given for materials in their standard state (at 25 °C [77 °F], 100 kPa). verify (what is ?) Infobox references

Carpaine is the major piperidine alkaloid component of papaya leaves which has been studied for potential medicinal effects. Carpaine extracted from Carica papaya trees has been reported to have diverse biological properties, such as anti-malarial, anti-inflammatory, anti-oxidant, and vasodilatory effects. Especially, Carpaine possessed significant anti-plasmodial activity in vitro (IC_{50} of 0.2 μM) and high selectivity towards the parasites.

Circulatory effects of carpaine were studied in Wistar male rats weighing 314 +/- 13 g, under pentobarbital (30 mg/kg) anesthesia. Increasing dosages of carpaine from 0.5 mg/kg to 2.0 mg/kg resulted in progressive decrease in systolic, diastolic, and mean arterial blood pressure. Selective autonomic nervous blockade with atropine sulfate (1 mg/kg) or propranolol hydrochloride (8 mg/kg) did not alter the circulatory response to carpaine. Carpaine, 2 mg/kg, reduced cardiac output, stroke volume, stroke work, and cardiac power, but the calculated total peripheral resistance remained unchanged. It is concluded from these results that carpaine affects the myocardium directly. The effects of carpaine may be related to its macrocyclic dilactone structure, a possible cation chelating structure.

== History ==
After the first isolation of Carpaine by Greshoff in 1890, Merck & Company assigned the empirical formula C_{14}H_{27}NO_{2} to it, which was soon corrected to C_{14}H_{25}NO_{2} by van Rijn. In 1930s, Barger and his collogues investigated various degradation products of Carpaine and was able to obtain a series of chemical structures of Carpaine.

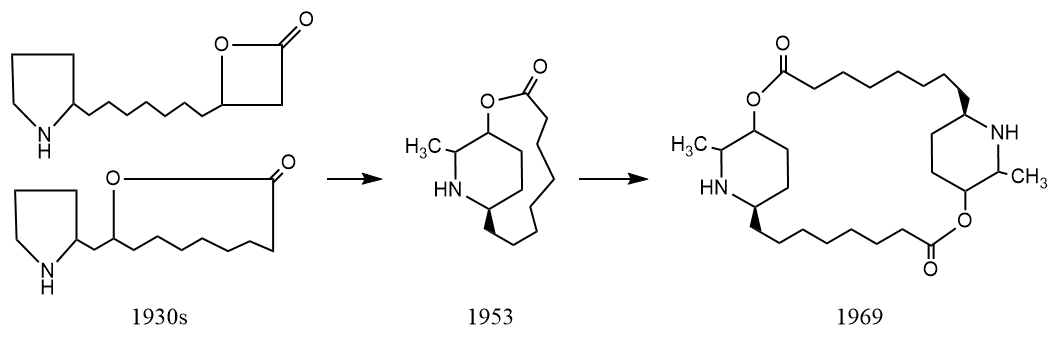
The development of Carpaine structures over the years

Then in 1953, Rapoport and his collogues at the University of California obtained a new form of Carpaine chemical structure which they found the nitrogen-containing ring had a piperidine structure instead of the pyrrolidine as previously thought; they also located the position of the lactone ring between atoms numbered 3 and 6 on the piperidine nucleus. Later work from Govindachari & Narasimhan and Tichy and Sicher further confirmed this structural formula.

However, Spiteller-Friedmann and Spiteller used Mass Spectrometry to discover that the molecular weight of Carpaine is closer to 478 g/mol, which is represented by twice of the original empirical formula. The new finding proved that Carpaine consists of two identical halves, which form a 26-membered cyclic diester, or dilactone, with an empirical formula of C_{28}H_{50}N_{2}O_{4}, and the configuration was finally determined by Coke and Rice in 1965.

== Isolation of Carpaine ==
Carpaine occurs in papaya leaves in concentrations as high as 0.4%, which is enough to make it available commercially at very reasonable costs.

One possible extraction route was accomplished first drying the leaves in an electric blast drying oven and milled to fine powder. The powdered plant material were macerated with a mixed solution of ethanol/water/HCl for 24 hrs at room temperature. Then the extract was dissolved in water/HCl mixture, filtered, and extracted with petroleum ether to remove fat materials. The acid fraction was adjusted to pH 8.0 ~ 9.0 using NH_{4}OH solution and extracted with chloroform. Finally, the chloroform fractions were pooled and evaporated and the whole operation was repeated again so the crude alkaloid Carpaine was obtained.

Another extraction route reported that mechanical blending of the leaves prior to extraction significantly enhances the yield of Carpaine. After blending the leaves with water and freeze-dried, the samples were soaked in ethanol. This mixture was then concentrated and purified using an acid-base method followed by chloroform extraction to isolate the Carpaine. Finally, the purity and structure were analyzed using NMR and LC-MS.

== Potential Medical Uses ==
=== Dengue Fever Treatment ===
Recent research highlights the possible efficacy of Carpaine in managing the symptoms and severe complications associated with dengue fever. Carpaine in papaya leaves extract is the major active compounds that contributes to the anti-thrombocytopenic activity (raising the platelet counts in patient's blood). For example, a treatment used for a 45-year-old male patient in Pakistan diagonosed with dengue fever involved administering 25mL of the extracted Carpaine twice daily for five consecutive days. The treatment showed significant improvement in hematological parameters, a substantial increase in platelet and blood cell counts and neutrophil levels.

=== Cardioprotective Effects ===
In the setting of ischemia-reperfusion injury (IRI), studies have shown Carpaine provided significant protection to recover the wounded area affected by the hydrogen peroxide treatment by activating key pathway that promotes cell cycle progression and prevents cell death during stressful condition. Furthermore, Carpaine treatment further demonstrates its cardioprotective effects by improving mitochondrial membrane potential and reducing the overproduction of reactive oxygen species.

=== Anti-inflammatory Properties ===
Studies have shown Carpaine’s ability to modulate the body’s inflammatory response by inhibiting the production of pro-inflammatory cytokines, such as tumor necrosis factor-alpha (TNF-α) and interleukin-6 (IL-6), which would be beneficial in treating chronic disease, including rheumatoid arthritis, asthma, etc.

=== Anti-oxidant Properties ===
The enhanced anti-oxidant activity in papaya leaves demonstrated in studies is due to the high concentration of polyphenols, which are known for their strong anti-oxidant properties for combatting oxidative stress in the body, that can lead to cellular damage and various chronic diseases. The anti-oxidant capacity was measured using the DPPH (1,1-diphenyl-2-picrylhydrazyl) assay, where blended young papaya leaves exhibited significantly lower IC_{50} values (IC_{50} = 293 μg/mL per 100 mg) with a stronger anti-oxidant potency than old leaves (IC_{50} = 382 μg/mL per 100 mg).
