= Dihydrocuscohygrine =

Names
- Preferred IUPAC name 1,3-Bis[(2S)-1-methylpyrrolidin-2-yl]propan-2-ol

Identifiers
CAS Number	58131-40-1
3D model (JSmol)	Interactive image
ChemSpider	9250278
PubChem CID	11075129
UNII	S8NA96NN7T
CompTox Dashboard (EPA)	DTXSID901045577
- InChI: InChI=1S/C13H26N2O/c1-14-7-3-5-11(14)9-13(16)10-12-6-4-8-15(12)2/h11-13,16H,3-10H2,1-2H3/t11-,12-/m0/s1 Key: UOJNOOLFFFFKNA-RYUDHWBXSA-N; InChI=1/C13H26N2O/c1-14-7-3-5-11(14)9-13(16)10-12-6-4-8-15(12)2/h11-13,16H,3-10H2,1-2H3/t11-,12-/m0/s1 Key: UOJNOOLFFFFKNA-RYUDHWBXBH
- SMILES: OC(C[C@H]1N(C)CCC1)C[C@H]2N(C)CCC2

Properties
Chemical formula	C_{13}H_{26}N_{2}O
Molar mass	226.364 g·mol^{−1}
- Except where otherwise noted, data are given for materials in their standard state (at 25 °C [77 °F], 100 kPa). Infobox references

Dihydrocuscohygrine is an alkaloid that has been isolated from coca leaves.

== See also ==
- Cuscohygrine
- Pseudotropine
