= Hydroxytropacocaine =

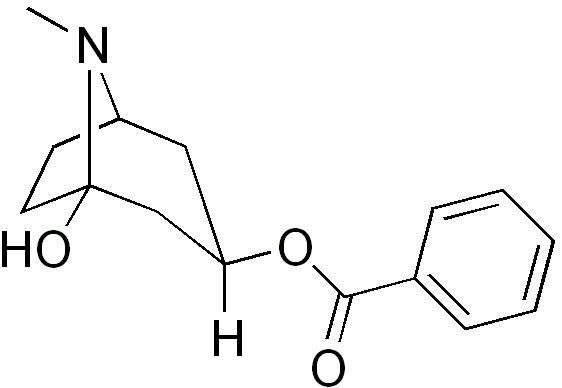

Names
- IUPAC name 1-Hydroxy-8-methyl-8-aza-bicyclo[3.2.1]oct-3-yl benzoate

Identifiers
CAS Number	156497-23-3
3D model (JSmol)	Interactive image
ChemSpider	9229602
PubChem CID	11054441
UNII	AZ7T24X2DR
CompTox Dashboard (EPA)	DTXSID20453559
- InChI: InChI=1S/C15H19NO3/c1-16-12-7-8-15(16,18)10-13(9-12)19-14(17)11-5-3-2-4-6-11/h2-6,12-13,18H,7-10H2,1H3/t12-,13-,15-/m1/s1 Key: XJPJWHPAEMZDER-UMVBOHGHSA-N; InChI=1/C15H19NO3/c1-16-12-7-8-15(16,18)10-13(9-12)19-14(17)11-5-3-2-4-6-11/h2-6,12-13,18H,7-10H2,1H3/t12-,13-,15-/m1/s1 Key: XJPJWHPAEMZDER-UMVBOHGHBB
- SMILES: O=C(O[C@@H]1C[C@@H]2N(C)[C@](O)(C1)CC2)c3ccccc3

Properties
Chemical formula	C_{15}H_{19}NO_{3}
Molar mass	261.32 g/mol
- Except where otherwise noted, data are given for materials in their standard state (at 25 °C [77 °F], 100 kPa). verify (what is ?) Infobox references

Hydroxytropacocaine is a tropane alkaloid found in Erythroxylum coca.

== See also ==
- Coca alkaloids
