= Gentianine =

Names
- IUPAC name 5-Ethenyl-3,4-dihydropyrano[3,4-c]pyridin-1-one
- Other names Erythricine

Identifiers
CAS Number	439-89-4
3D model (JSmol)	Interactive image
Beilstein Reference	137011
ChEBI	CHEBI:28981
ChEMBL	ChEMBL4753058
ChemSpider	314782
KEGG	C06525
PubChem CID	354616
UNII	C2PD310UXB
CompTox Dashboard (EPA)	DTXSID00963141
- InChI: InChI=1S/C10H9NO2/c1-2-7-5-11-6-9-8(7)3-4-13-10(9)12/h2,5-6H,1,3-4H2 Key: DFNZYFAJQPLJFI-UHFFFAOYSA-N
- SMILES: C=CC1=CN=CC2=C1CCOC2=O

Properties
Chemical formula	C_{10}H_{9}NO_{2}
Molar mass	175.187 g·mol^{−1}
Melting point	82–83 °C (180–181 °F; 355–356 K)
- Except where otherwise noted, data are given for materials in their standard state (at 25 °C [77 °F], 100 kPa). Infobox references

Gentianine is a pyridine-derived alkaloid. Originally isolated in 1944 from Gentiana kirilowi, it has also been found in Gentiana macrophylla, fenugreek, Strychnos angolensis, Strychnos xantha, and other plants.

Gentianine is a crystalline solid with a melting point of 82-83 °C. It is a base that forms salts, such as the hydrochloride salt, upon treatment with acids.

Gentianine has been studied for its potential anti-inflammatory properties.
