= Hygrine =

- Chemical structure of hygrine

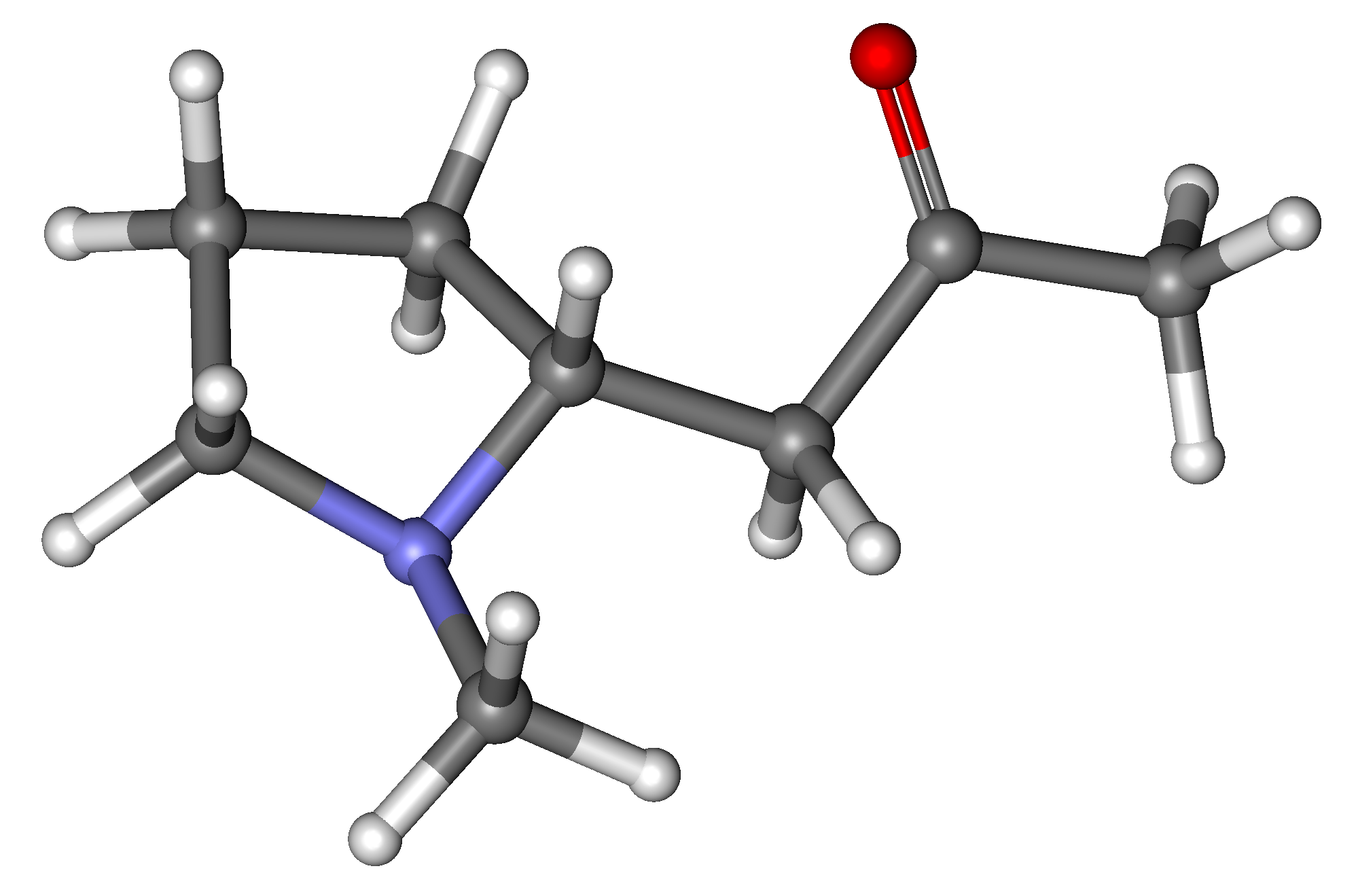
- Ball-and-stick model of hygrine molecule

Names
- Preferred IUPAC name 1-[(2R)-1-Methylpyrrolidin-2-yl]propan-2-one

Identifiers
CAS Number	496-49-1
3D model (JSmol)	Interactive image
ChEBI	CHEBI:46750
ChemSpider	389762
ECHA InfoCard	100.007.112
KEGG	C06179
PubChem CID	440933
UNII	49H1LNM62X
CompTox Dashboard (EPA)	DTXSID40894081
- InChI: InChI=1S/C8H15NO/c1-7(10)6-8-4-3-5-9(8)2/h8H,3-6H2,1-2H3/t8-/m1/s1 Key: ADKXZIOQKHHDNQ-MRVPVSSYSA-N; InChI=1/C8H15NO/c1-7(10)6-8-4-3-5-9(8)2/h8H,3-6H2,1-2H3/t8-/m1/s1 Key: ADKXZIOQKHHDNQ-MRVPVSSYBT
- SMILES: CC(=O)C[C@H]1CCCN1C

Properties
Chemical formula	C_{8}H_{15}NO
Molar mass	141.21 g/mol
Boiling point	193 to 195 °C (379 to 383 °F; 466 to 468 K)
- Except where otherwise noted, data are given for materials in their standard state (at 25 °C [77 °F], 100 kPa). verify (what is ?) Infobox references

Hygrine is a pyrrolidine alkaloid, found mainly in coca leaves (0.2%). It was first isolated by Carl Liebermann in 1889 (along with a related compound cuscohygrine) as an alkaloid accompanying cocaine in coca. Hygrine is extracted as a thick yellow oil, having a pungent taste and odor.

== See also ==
- Coca alkaloids
- Pseudotropine
- Troparil
