= Pyrrolidine =

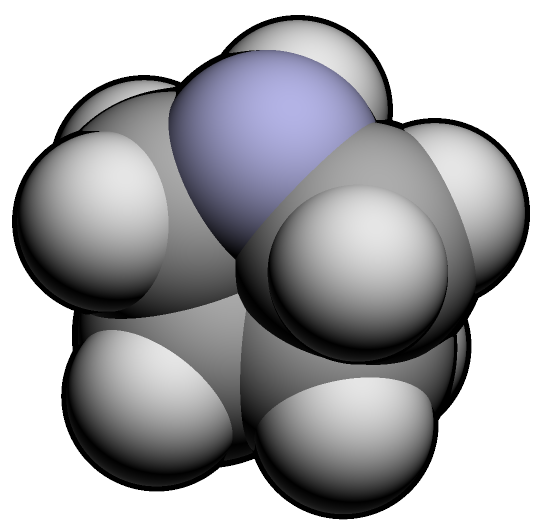

Names
- Preferred IUPAC name Pyrrolidine
- Other names Azolidine; Azacyclopentane; Tetrahydropyrrole; Prolamine; Azolane

Identifiers
CAS Number	123-75-1
3D model (JSmol)	Interactive image
Beilstein Reference	102395
ChEBI	CHEBI:33135
ChEMBL	ChEMBL22830
ChemSpider	29008
ECHA InfoCard	100.004.227
EC Number	204-648-7
Gmelin Reference	1704
PubChem CID	31268
RTECS number	UX9650000
UNII	LJU5627FYV
UN number	1922
CompTox Dashboard (EPA)	DTXSID3059559
- InChI: InChI=1S/C4H9N/c1-2-4-5-3-1/h5H,1-4H2 Key: RWRDLPDLKQPQOW-UHFFFAOYSA-N; InChI=1/C4H9N/c1-2-4-5-3-1/h5H,1-4H2 Key: RWRDLPDLKQPQOW-UHFFFAOYAX
- SMILES: C1CCNC1

Properties
Chemical formula	C_{4}H_{9}N
Molar mass	71.123 g·mol^{−1}
Appearance	Clear colorless liquid
Density	0.866 g/cm^{3}
Melting point	−63 °C (−81 °F; 210 K)
Boiling point	87 °C (189 °F; 360 K)
Solubility in water	Miscible
Acidity (pK_{a})	11.27 (pK_{a} of conjugate acid in water), 19.56 (pK_{a} of conjugate acid in acetonitrile)
Magnetic susceptibility (χ)	−54.8·10^{−6} cm^{3}/mol
Refractive index (n_{D})	1.4402 at 28°C

Hazards
- Occupational safety and health (OHS/OSH)
Main hazards	highly flammable, harmful, corrosive, possible mutagen
- GHS labelling
Pictograms	(GHS02: Flammable) (GHS05: Corrosive) (GHS07: Exclamation mark)
Signal word	Danger
Hazard statements	H225, H302, H314, H332
Precautionary statements	P210, P233, P240, P241, P242, P243, P260, P264, P270, P271, P280, P301+P312, P301+P330+P331, P303+P361+P353, P304+P312, P304+P340, P305+P351+P338, P310, P312, P321, P330, P363, P370+P378, P403+P235, P405, P501
NFPA 704 (fire diamond)	3 3 1
Flash point	3 °C (37 °F; 276 K)
Autoignition temperature	345 °C (653 °F; 618 K)
Safety data sheet (SDS)	MSDS

Related compounds
Related nitrogen heterocyclic compounds	Pyrrole (aromatic with two double bonds); Pyrroline (one double bond); Pyrrolizidine (two pentagonal rings)
- Except where otherwise noted, data are given for materials in their standard state (at 25 °C [77 °F], 100 kPa). verify (what is ?) Infobox references

Pyrrolidine, also known as tetrahydropyrrole, is an organic compound with the molecular formula (CH_{2})_{4}NH. It is a cyclic secondary amine, also classified as a saturated heterocycle. It is a colourless liquid that is miscible with water and most organic solvents. It has a characteristic odor that has been described as "ammoniacal, fishy, shellfish-like". In addition to pyrrolidine itself, many substituted pyrrolidines are known.

== Production and synthesis ==
=== Industrial production ===
Pyrrolidine is prepared industrially by the reaction of 1,4-butanediol and ammonia at a temperature of 165–200 °C and a pressure of 17–21 MPa in the presence of a cobalt- and nickel oxide catalyst, which is supported on alumina.

The reaction is carried out in the liquid phase in a continuous tube- or tube bundle reactor, which is operated in the cycle gas method. The catalyst is arranged as a fixed-bed and the conversion is carried out in the downflow mode. The product is obtained after multistage purification and separation by extractive and azeotropic distillation.

=== Laboratory synthesis ===
In the laboratory, pyrrolidine was usually synthesised by treating 4-chlorobutan-1-amine with a strong base:

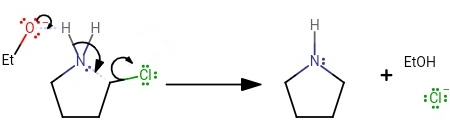

Furthermore, 5-membered N-heterocyclic ring of the pyrrolidine derivatives can be synthesized via cascade reactions.

== Occurrence ==
Many modifications of pyrrolidine are found in natural and synthetic drugs and drug candidates. The pyrrolidine ring structure is present in numerous natural alkaloids i.a. nicotine and hygrine. It is found in many drugs such as procyclidine and bepridil. It also forms the basis for the racetam compounds (e.g. piracetam, aniracetam). The amino acids proline and hydroxyproline are, in a structural sense, derivatives of pyrrolidine.

Nicotine contains an N-methylpyrrolidine ring linked to a pyridine ring.

== Reactions ==
Pyrrolidine is a base. Its basicity is typical of other dialkyl amines. Relative to many secondary amines, pyrrolidine is distinctive because of its compactness, a consequence of its cyclic structure.

Pyrrolidine is used as a building block in the synthesis of more complex organic compounds. It is used to activate ketones and aldehydes toward nucleophilic addition by formation of enamines (e.g. used in the Stork enamine alkylation):

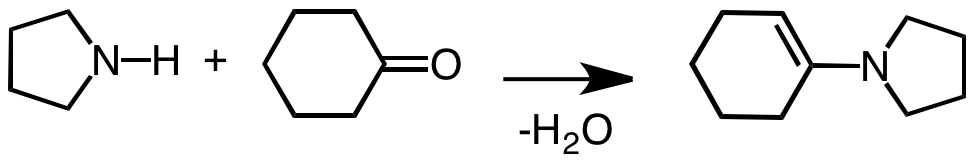
