= Meteloidine =

Names
- IUPAC name [(6R,7S)-6,7-Dihydroxy-8-methyl-8-azabicyclo[3.2.1]octan-3-yl] (E)-2-methylbut-2-enoate

Identifiers
CAS Number	526-13-6
3D model (JSmol)	Interactive image
ChEBI	CHEBI:6800
ChemSpider	4445158
KEGG	C10861
PubChem CID	5281864
UNII	JN0S84O367
- InChI: InChI=1S/C13H21NO4/c1-4-7(2)13(17)18-8-5-9-11(15)12(16)10(6-8)14(9)3/h4,8-12,15-16H,5-6H2,1-3H3/b7-4+/t8?,9?,10?,11-,12+ Key: YZFJTFVPCWEPND-JHOCIBHQSA-N
- SMILES: C/C=C(\C)/C(=O)OC1CC2[C@@H]([C@@H](C(C1)N2C)O)O

Properties
Chemical formula	C_{13}H_{21}NO_{4}
Molar mass	255.314 g·mol^{−1}
- Except where otherwise noted, data are given for materials in their standard state (at 25 °C [77 °F], 100 kPa). Infobox references

Meteloidine is an alkaloid found in some Brugmansia and Datura species. Its also found in Erythroxylum australe and is said to be cocaine-like alkaloid.

== Occurrence ==
The first report of the isolation from a natural source of meteloidine was in 1908 by Frank Lee Pyman and William Colebrook Reynolds from the flowering plant Datura metel along Angelate ester and Datura meteloides (now reclassified as Datura innoxia).

Meteloidine is primarily found in solanaceous plants, and in one species of genus Erythroxylum. It has been found in the leaves and flowers of Brugmansia × candida, and in the roots of Datura leichhardtii, Brugmansia suaveolens, Anthocercis littorea and Anthocercis viscosa in minor quantities, and in Anthocercis genistoides as its principal alkaloid. Meteloidine has been identified in Erythroxylum australe, which is of chemotaxonomic interest as meteloidine has been found in a number of the Solanaceae family, but in only one species in the family Erythroxylaceae.

== See also ==
- Daturadiol
- Serpentine
- Catuabine
