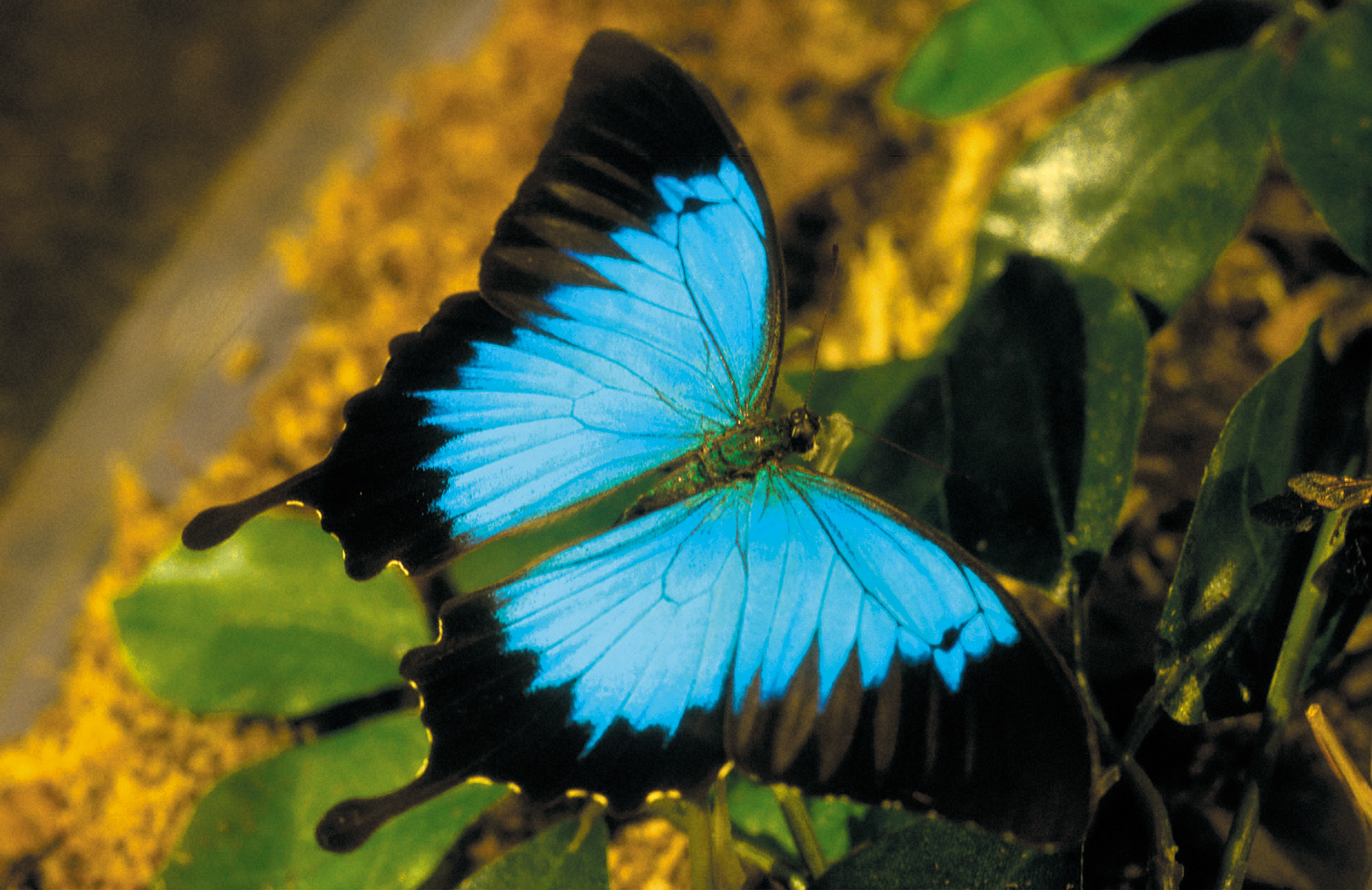

Scientific classification
- Kingdom: Animalia
- Phylum: Arthropoda
- Clade: Pancrustacea
- Class: Insecta
- Order: Lepidoptera
- Family: Papilionidae
- Genus: Papilio
- Species: P. ulysses

Binomial name
- Papilio ulysses Linnaeus, 1758

Subspecies
- P. u. autolycus C.Felder & R.Felder, 1865; P. u. denticulatus Joicey & Talbot, 1916; P. u. dirce Jordan, 1909; P. u. jennifeae Jakusch, 2007; P. u. ulysses Linnaeus, 1758; See text

= Papilio ulysses =

Species of butterfly

Papilio ulysses, the Ulysses butterfly (also known as the blue mountain swallowtail butterfly or Blue emperor), is a large swallowtail butterfly, in the subgenus Achillides, of Australia, Indonesia, Papua New Guinea and the Solomon Islands. Its size varies depending on subspecies, but the wingspan is about 10.5 cm (4.1 in) in Queensland.

This butterfly is used as an emblem for tourism in Queensland, Australia.

== Description ==
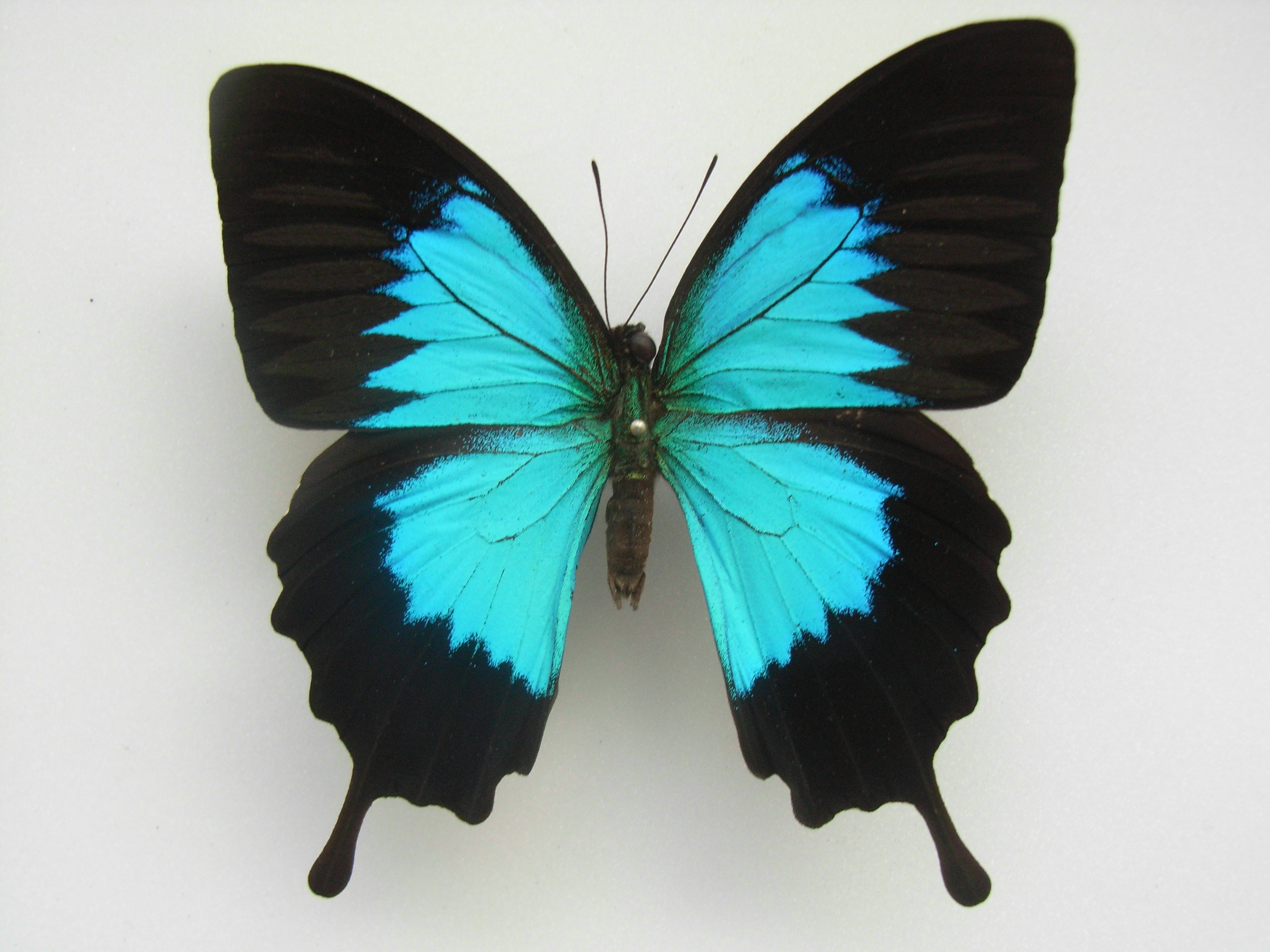
Male of Papilio ulysses ambiguus from New Britain, Papua New Guinea

The Ulysses butterfly typically has a wingspan of about 14 cm (5.5 in), but depending on subspecies has some variations in size (western subspecies largest). The upperside of the wings are an iridescent electric blue; the underside is a more subdued black and brown. The colours are produced by the microscopic structure of the scales, a phenomenon called structural colouration.

The female of the species is different from the male in that she has little crescents of blue in the back, upside sections of her hindwings, where there is only black for males. When the butterfly is perched the intense blue of its wings is hidden by the plainer brown under side of its wings, helping it to blend in with its surroundings. When in flight, the butterfly can be seen hundreds of meters away as sudden bright blue flashes. Males are strongly attracted to the color blue, including blue objects which are sometimes mistaken for females.

Karl Jordan in Seitz (83–85) provides a full account of ulysses forma pdf

== Similar species ==
The other members of the Papilio ulysses species group.

- Papilio montrouzieri Boisduval, 1859
- Papilio syfanius Oberthür, 1886

== Subspecies ==
- P. u. ulysses Seran, Ambon
- P. u. telemachus Montrouzier, 1856 Trobriand, Fergusson, Goodenough
- P. u. telegonus C. & R. Felder, 1860 Bachan, Ternate, Halmahera
- P. u. autolycus C. & R. Felder, 1865 West Irian - Papua
- P. u. joesa Butler, 1869 Cape York - McKay, Queensland
- P. u. orsippus Godman & Salvin, 1888 Choiseul, Isabel, Guadalcanal, Florida Island
- P. u. ambiguus Rothschild, 1895 Bismarck Archipelago
- P. u. melanotica Hagen, 1897 Moluccas
- P. u. gabrielis Rothschild, 1898 Admiralty Is.
- P. u. nigerrimus Ribbe, 1898 Bougainville, Shortland Is.
- P. u. morotaicus Rothschild, 1908 Morotai Island
- P. u. dohertius Rothschild, 1898 Obi
- P. u. ampelius Rothschild, 1908 Buru
- P. u. oxyartes Fruhstorfer, 1909 Aru
- P. u. georgius Rothschild, 1908 New Georgia Group

== Diet and conservation ==
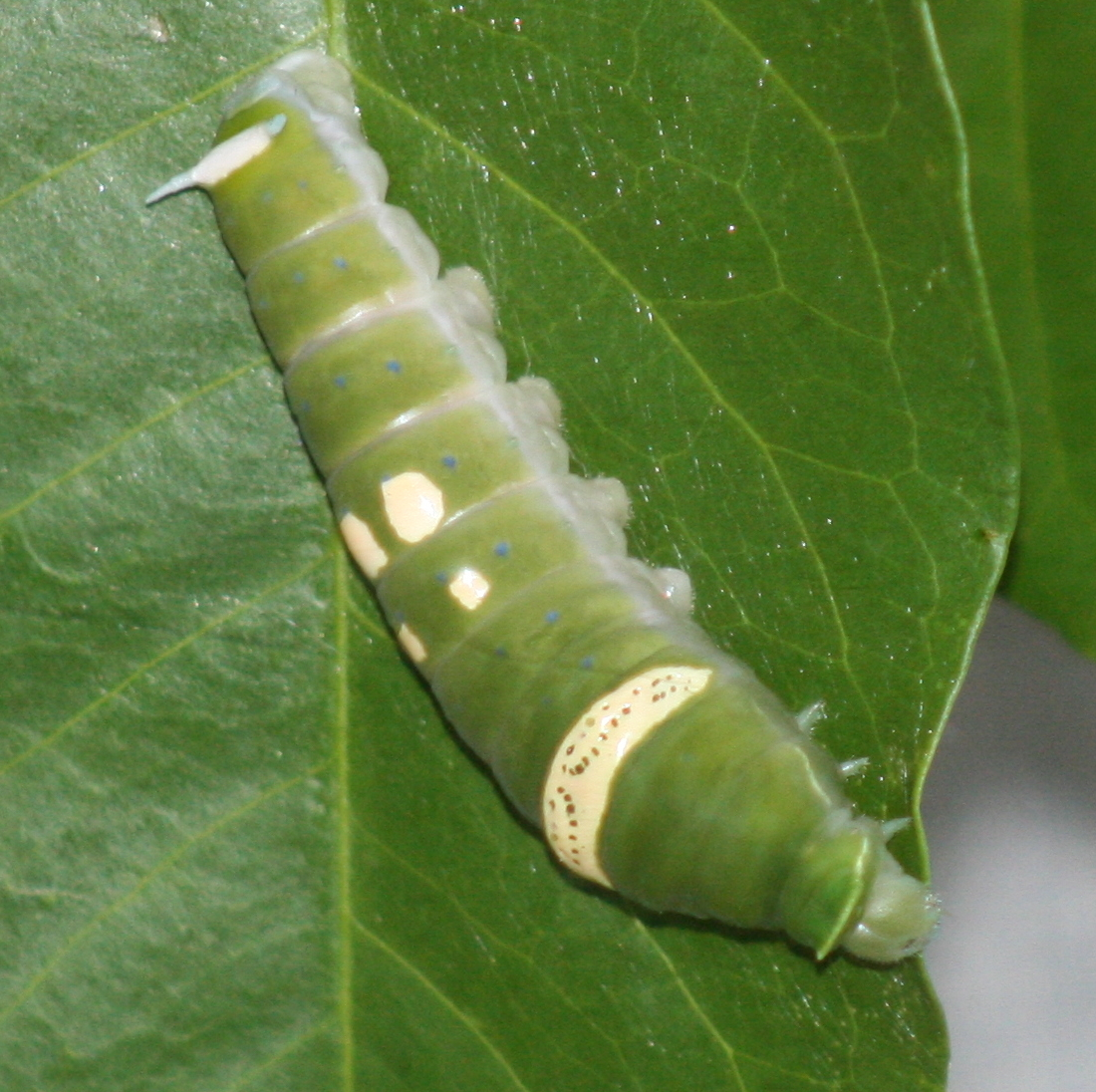
Caterpillar

=== Conservation ===
The Ulysses butterfly inhabits tropical rainforest areas and suburban gardens. The Australian government requires breeders to obtain permits, although the species is not endangered. In the past, this butterfly had been threatened but planting pink flowered doughwood has increased its numbers. Reduction in the number of the Euodia trees, a tree heavily used for laying eggs and for leaves eaten by caterpillars, may threaten the survival of this butterfly. Females favour small trees up to 2 metres tall to lay their eggs.

=== Diet ===
The larval food plants of this butterfly include kerosene wood, a variety of Citrus, and Euodia. In Australia, the Ulysses butterfly imago is known to feed from the blossoms of the pink flowered doughwood, a tree with clusters of small pink flowers that extrude from its branches.
