= Tropanyl phenylacetate =

- racemic tropanyl phenylacetate

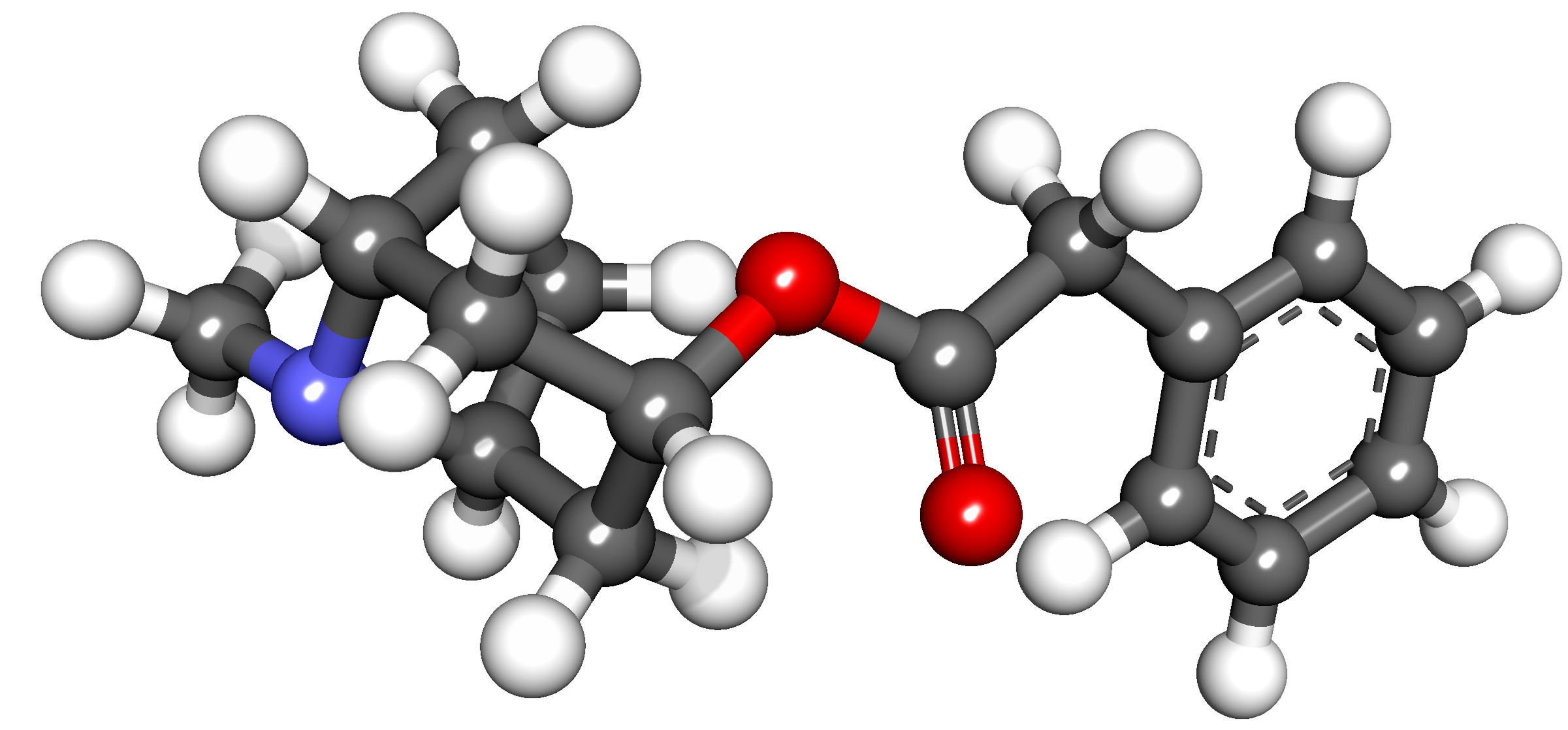
- racemic mixture

Names
- IUPAC name (8-methyl-8-azabicyclo[3.2.1]octan-3-yl) 2-phenylacetate

Identifiers
CAS Number	1690-22-8
3D model (JSmol)	Interactive image
ChEMBL	ChEMBL1190384
ChemSpider	174029
PubChem CID	201009
CompTox Dashboard (EPA)	DTXSID10276794
- InChI: InChI=1S/C16H21NO2/c1-17-13-7-8-14(17)11-15(10-13)19-16(18)9-12-5-3-2-4-6-12/h2-6,13-15H,7-11H2,1H3 Key: DCINQANYMBYYCH-UHFFFAOYSA-N
- SMILES: CN1C2CCC1CC(C2)OC(=O)CC3=CC=CC=C3

Properties
Chemical formula	C_{16}H_{21}NO_{2}
Molar mass	259.349 g·mol^{−1}
- Except where otherwise noted, data are given for materials in their standard state (at 25 °C [77 °F], 100 kPa). Infobox references

Tropanyl phenylacetate, also known as phenylacetoxy tropane It is a tropane alkaloid found in plants of the Erythroxylaceae family. This alkaloid is structurally closely related to tropacocaine and atropine.

it was found in plants of the Erythroxylaceae family; it was found in the plants Erythroxylum moonii, erythroxylum monogynum, it has also been detected in the chemical composition of the coca bush (Erythroxylum coca var. coca).
