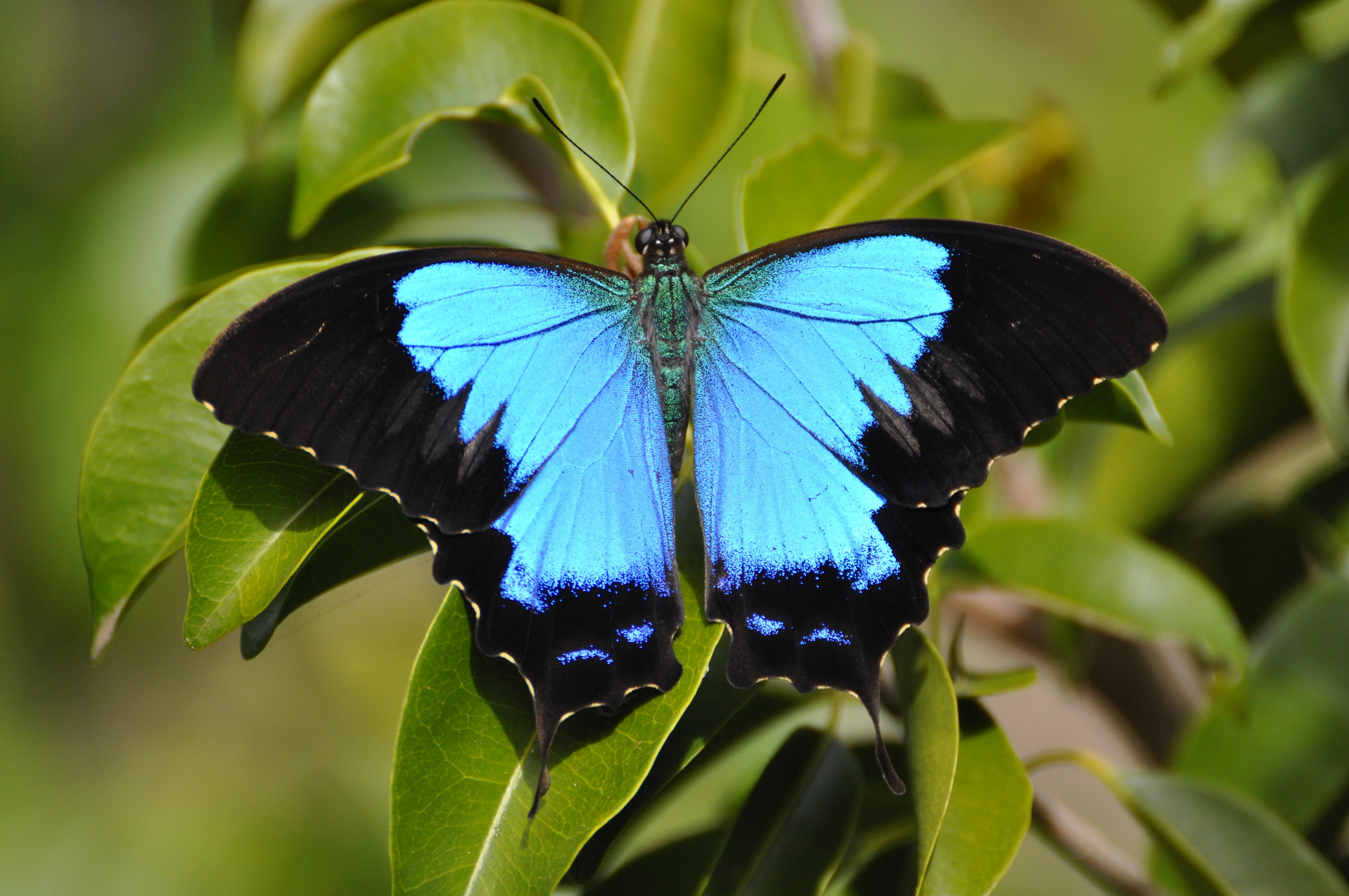
- Tereka dry forests, Noumea, New Caledonia

Scientific classification
- Kingdom: Animalia
- Phylum: Arthropoda
- Clade: Pancrustacea
- Class: Insecta
- Order: Lepidoptera
- Family: Papilionidae
- Genus: Papilio
- Species: P. montrouzieri

Binomial name
- Papilio montrouzieri Boisduval, 1859

Synonyms
- Papilio chaudoiri C. & R. Felder, 1860; Papilio ulysses var. ulyssinus Westwood, 1860; Papilio ulysses var. ulyssinus ab. ulyssellus Westwood, 1860; Papilio westwoodi Oberthür, 1879

= Papilio montrouzieri =

Species of butterfly

Papilio montrouzieri, occasionally referred to as the New Caledonian tailless Ulysses, is a species of swallowtail butterfly from the genus Papilio that is endemic to New Caledonia. It resembles the more widespread relative, Papilio ulysses. Its name refers to French entomologist, explorer and priest Xavier Montrouzier.

== Description ==
P. montrouzieri Bdv. (= ulyssinus Westw., chaudoiri Fldr.). Smaller than all the forms of P. ulysses, both wings more strongly sinuous between the veins, the forewing beneath with yellowish grey transverse bar in the cell and crescents of the same colour as proximal bordering to the grey discal area; the submarginal spots of the hindwing darker yellow than in P. ulysses. The genitalia are extraordinarily different from those of P.ulysses. The number of the pilose stripes in the and the extent of the blue in male and female are variable. The principal forms are: f. ulyssellus Westw., the blue reaches in the male to beyond the apex of the cell and completely encloses the small black discocellular spot; the pilose stripes are absent or feebly indicated, in the female the blue reaches to or nearly to the apex of the cell of the forewing. f. montrouzieri Bdv. (87 c), the blue in the male does not extend beyond the apex of the cell and extends in the female about to the 3. medial vein, the pilose stripes are narrow but distinct.f. westwoodi Oberth., the blue still more strongly reduced, the male with 4 or 5 rather broad pilose stripes. — New Caledonia and Loyalty Islands. Karl Jordan in Seitz.

== Taxonomy ==
montrouzieri is a member of species group: ulyssesThe members are

- Papilio montrouzieri Boisduval, 1859
- Papilio syfanius Oberthür, 1886
- Papilio ulysses Linnaeus, 1758

== See also ==
- Biodiversity of New Caledonia
