= Erythroxylum kochummenii =

Conservation status
- Vulnerable (IUCN 2.3)

Scientific classification
- Kingdom: Plantae
- Clade: Tracheophytes
- Clade: Angiosperms
- Clade: Eudicots
- Clade: Rosids
- Order: Malpighiales
- Family: Erythroxylaceae
- Genus: Erythroxylum
- Species: E. kochummenii

Binomial name
- Erythroxylum kochummenii Ng

Species of tree

Erythroxylum kochummenii is a species of plant in the Erythroxylaceae family. It is a tree endemic to Peninsular Malaysia. It is threatened by habitat loss.
