= Erythroxylum cambodianum =

Scientific classification
- Kingdom: Plantae
- Clade: Embryophytes
- Clade: Tracheophytes
- Clade: Angiosperms
- Clade: Eudicots
- Clade: Rosids
- Order: Malpighiales
- Family: Erythroxylaceae
- Genus: Erythroxylum
- Species: E. cambodianum

Binomial name
- Erythroxylum cambodianum Pierre

Synonyms
- Erythroxylum oblanceolatum Craib

Species of plant

Erythroxylum cambodianum is a shrub in the family Erythroxylaceae. It grows in Vietnam, Laos, Cambodia and Thailand. The wood is used for pickets and as firewood.

== Description and habitat ==
The taxa grows as a shrub some 1–3 m (3 ft 3 in – 9 ft 10 in) tall, in clear and pine forests.

== Distribution ==
The species occurs in a number of countries of Southeast Asia: Vietnam, Laos (recorded from its southernmost district, Khong District), Cambodia (including Phnom Kulen National Park), Thailand.

== Vernacular names ==
It is known as ភ្លៅមាន់ (phlov moan) (lit. Chicken's Thigh) in Khmer. In the Prey Lang Forest of northern Cambodia, it is referred to as chompussek. Amongst Kuy- and Khmer-speaking people living in the same villages of Stung Treng and Preah Vihear provinces of north-central Cambodia, it is referred to as ចំពុះសេក (chompussek) and ជង្គង់សេក (changkung sek). The villagers living on Phnom Kulen in northeastern Cambodia refer to the plants as ផ្តិលមាស (ptəl mias) and ចង្អេងសេក (jong eng sek). In northeastern Thailand it is known as huun-hai.

== Uses ==
In Cambodia the trunks are used to make pickets, the twigs are used as firewood. The stem is used in traditional medicine, while unidentified parts of the plant are used by the Kuy- and Khmer-speaking people living in the same villages of Stung Treng and Preah Vihear as a source of medicine. Villagers living within the Prey Lang Forest, Cambodia, use an infusion of the root to help with post-natal blood circulation and stimulation of appetite. A post-natal care medicine called lɔng is a decoction to drink made from 13 plants by villages on Phnom Kulen, one of the ingredients is the wood chips of Erythroxylum cambodianum. Within Thai traditional medicine, the plant is used for anti-fever purposes and as an anti-inflammatory agent.

The aerial parts of the species were identified as having the following phytochemicals with potential drug use: Two new acetophenone diglycosides, erythroxylosides A and B; two known flavans, one known flavonol glycoside and two known megastigmane glucosides: (+)-catechin, (-)-epicatechin, quercetin 3-O-rutinoside, (3S,5R,6R,7E,9Smegastigman-7-ene-3,5,6,9-tetrol 3-O-β-D-glucopyranoside and citroside A.

== History ==
The French botanist Jean Baptiste Louis Pierre published the taxa in his Flore Forestiere de la Cochinchine in 1893.
