= Erythroxylum zeylanicum =

Scientific classification
- Kingdom: Plantae
- Clade: Embryophytes
- Clade: Tracheophytes
- Clade: Angiosperms
- Clade: Eudicots
- Clade: Rosids
- Order: Malpighiales
- Family: Erythroxylaceae
- Genus: Erythroxylum
- Species: E. zeylanicum

Binomial name
- Erythroxylum zeylanicum O.E.Schulz

Species of flowering plant

Erythroxylum zeylanicum is a species of plant in the Erythroxylaceae family. It is endemic to Sri Lanka.

== Uses ==
leaves- medicinal.
