= Erythroxylum ruizii =

Conservation status
- Endangered (IUCN 3.1)

Scientific classification
- Kingdom: Plantae
- Clade: Tracheophytes
- Clade: Angiosperms
- Clade: Eudicots
- Clade: Rosids
- Order: Malpighiales
- Family: Erythroxylaceae
- Genus: Erythroxylum
- Species: E. ruizii

Binomial name
- Erythroxylum ruizii Peyr.

Species of flowering plant

Erythroxylum ruizii is a species of plant in the Erythroxylaceae family. It is endemic to Ecuador. Its natural habitat is subtropical or tropical dry forests.
