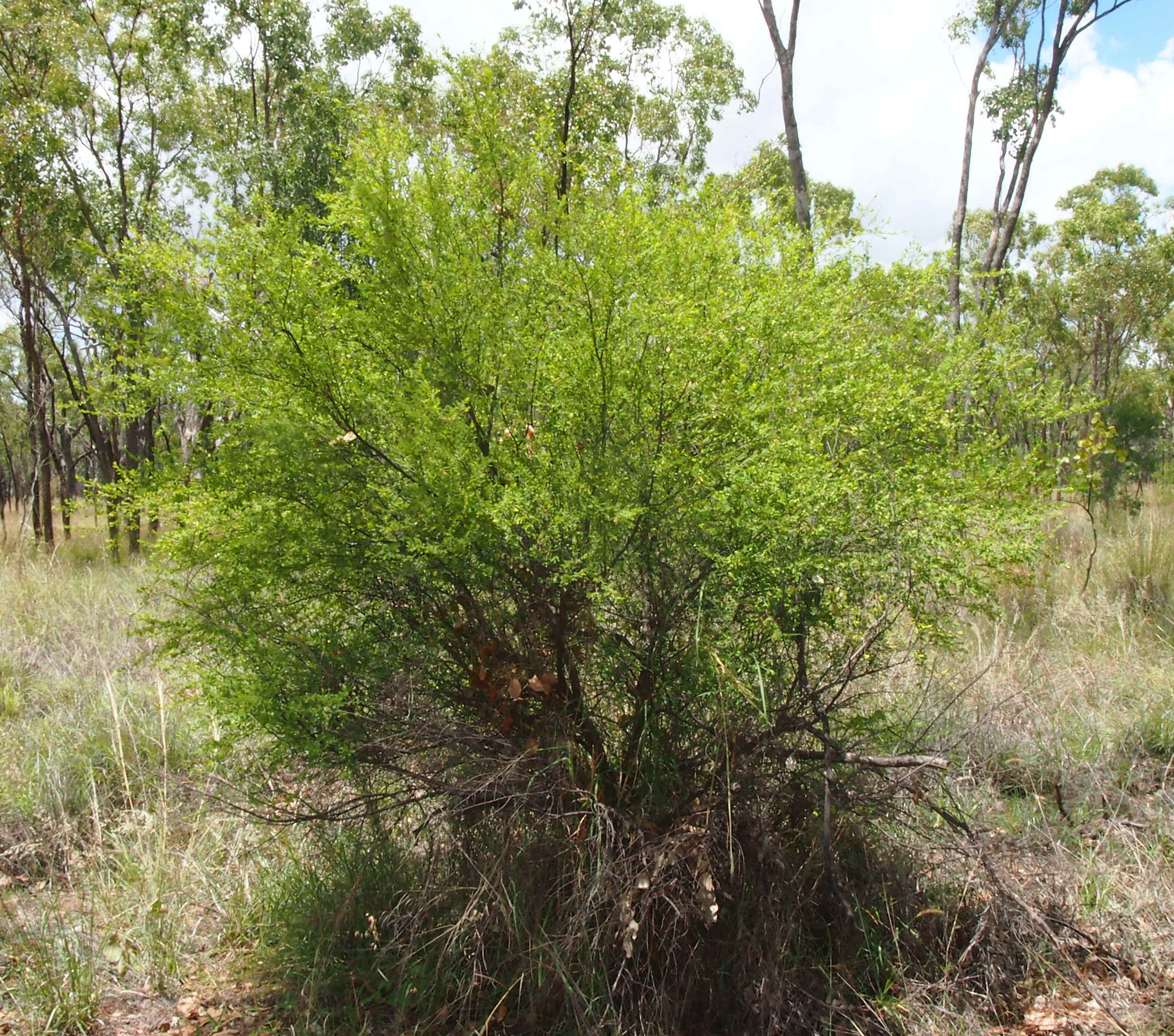

Scientific classification
- Kingdom: Plantae
- Clade: Tracheophytes
- Clade: Angiosperms
- Clade: Eudicots
- Clade: Rosids
- Order: Malpighiales
- Family: Erythroxylaceae
- Genus: Erythroxylum
- Species: E. australe

Binomial name
- Erythroxylum australe F.Muell.

= Erythroxylum australe =

Species of tree

Erythroxylum australe is a shrub or small tree endemic to northern Australia. The plant is known by a variety of names including Brigalow erythroxylon shrub and dogwood (unrelated to Cornus).

The plant grows in a wide variety of habitats in subcoastal and coastal regions, ranging from dry rainforest and vine thickets to open savanna woodland.

The leaves contain 0.8% meteloidine, an alkaloid similar to cocaine. All Erythroxylaceae species are banned in NSW.

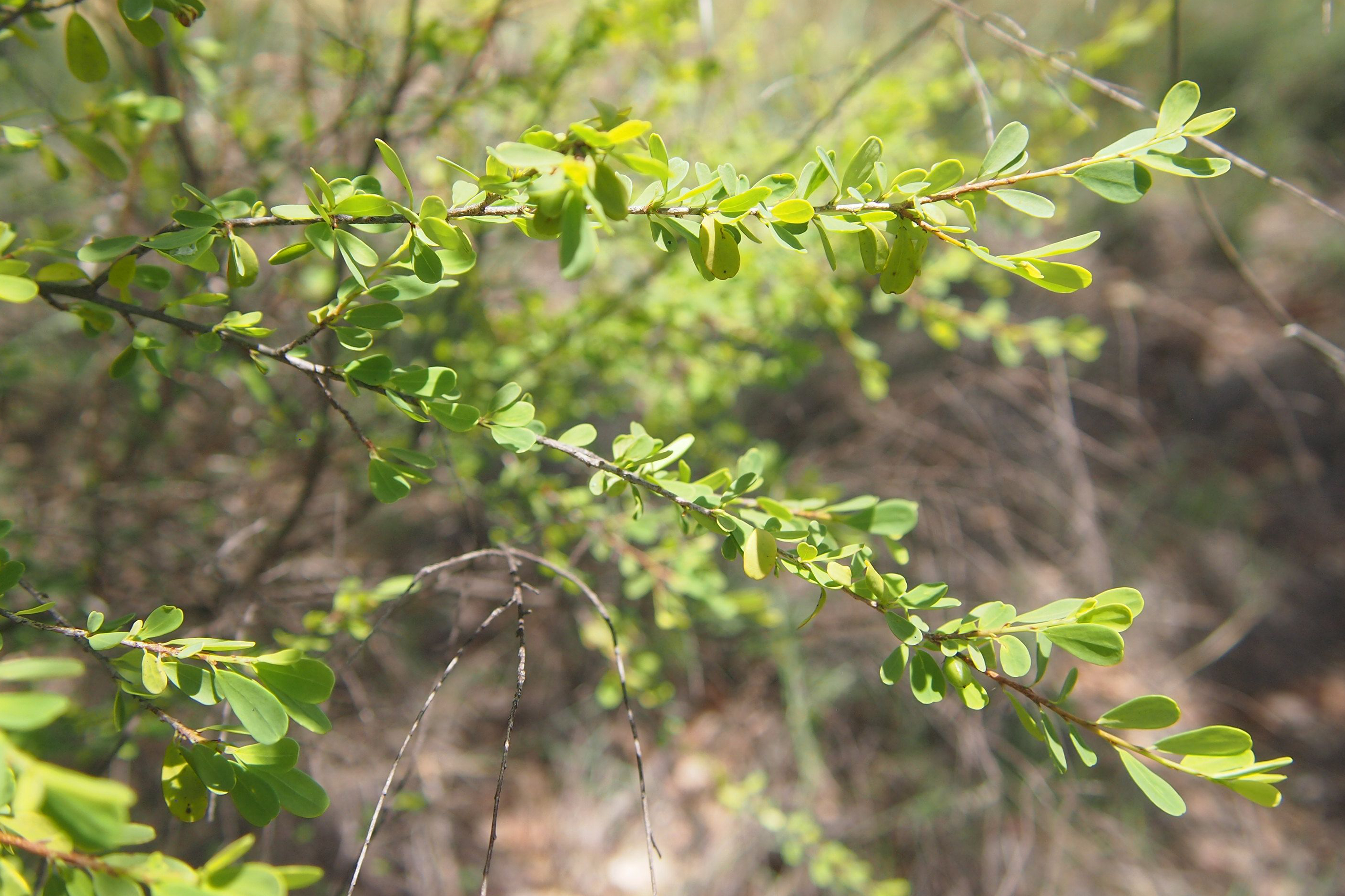
Erythroxylum australe foliage.
