= C16H21NO2 =

The molecular formula C_{16}H_{21}NO_{2} (molar mass: 259.34 g/mol, exact mass: 259.1572 u) may refer to:

- Nortilidine
- Propranolol
- Ramelteon
- Tropanyl phenylacetate
- Troparil
