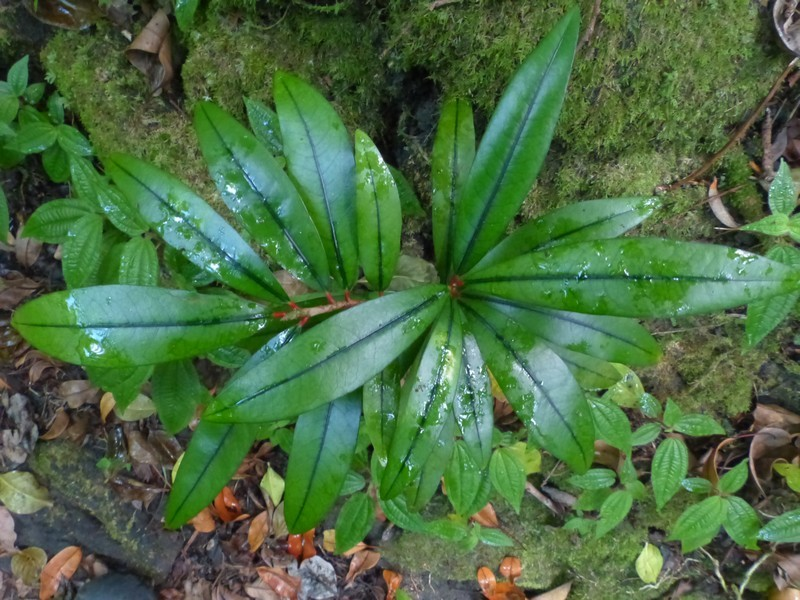

Scientific classification
- Kingdom: Plantae
- Clade: Embryophytes
- Clade: Tracheophytes
- Clade: Spermatophytes
- Clade: Angiosperms
- Clade: Eudicots
- Clade: Rosids
- Order: Malpighiales
- Family: Erythroxylaceae
- Genus: Erythroxylum
- Species: E. laurifolium

Binomial name
- Erythroxylum laurifolium Lam.

= Erythroxylum laurifolium =

Species of flowering plant

Erythroxylum laurifolium is a species from the genus Erythroxylum. It was first described by Jean-Baptiste de Lamarck.

== Range ==
The plant is endemic to Reunion and Mauritius.
