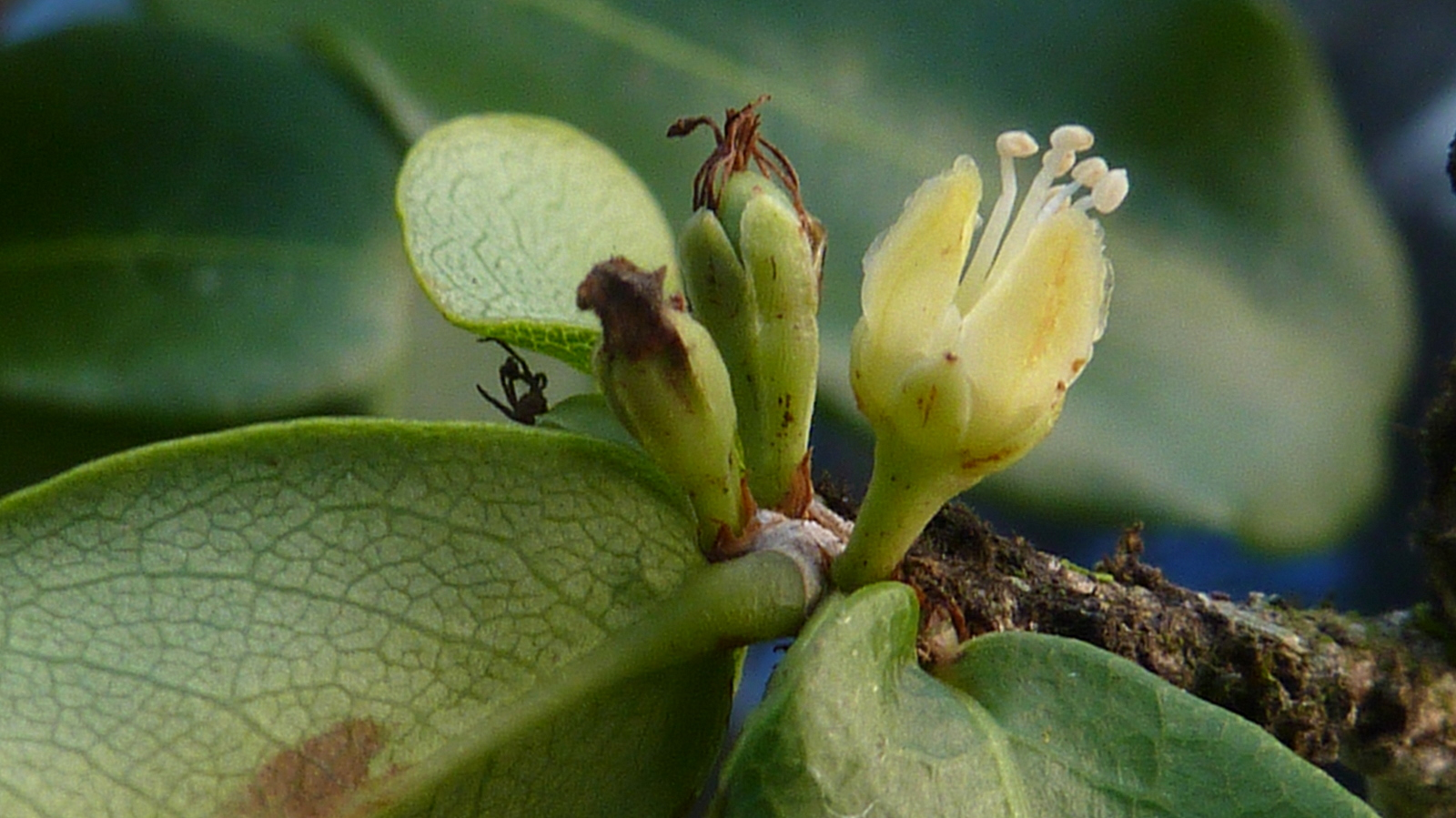

Scientific classification
- Kingdom: Plantae
- Clade: Tracheophytes
- Clade: Angiosperms
- Clade: Eudicots
- Clade: Rosids
- Order: Malpighiales
- Family: Erythroxylaceae
- Genus: Erythroxylum
- Species: E. vaccinifolium

Binomial name
- Erythroxylum vaccinifolium Mart. 1840

Synonyms
- Erythroxylum catuaba A.J.Silva ex Raym.-Hamet, 1936

= Erythroxylum vaccinifolium =

Species of flowering plant

Erythroxylum vaccinifolium is a flowering plant species in the genus Erythroxylum.

It is used to prepare catuaba, an infusion used as an aphrodisiac in Brazilian herbal medicine. It contains a class of tropane alkaloids called catuabines, more specifically the alkaloids catuabine A, B and C.
