= Erythroxylum rufum =

Conservation status
- Least Concern (IUCN 3.1)

Scientific classification
- Kingdom: Plantae
- Clade: Tracheophytes
- Clade: Angiosperms
- Clade: Eudicots
- Clade: Rosids
- Order: Malpighiales
- Family: Erythroxylaceae
- Genus: Erythroxylum
- Species: E. rufum

Binomial name
- Erythroxylum rufum Cav. 1789

Species of flowering plant

Erythroxylum rufum, the rufous false coca, is a flowering plant species in the genus Erythroxylum.

Ombuin-3-O-rhamnosylglucoside, a glycoside of ombuin, can be found in E. rufum.
