= Ombuin =

- Chemical structure of ombuin

Names
- IUPAC name 3,3′,5-Trihydroxy-4′,7-dimethoxyflavone
- Systematic IUPAC name 3,5-Dihydroxy-2-(3-hydroxy-4-methoxyphenyl)-7-methoxy-4H-1-benzopyran-4-one
- Other names 4′,7-Dimethylquercetin; 7,4′-Di-O-methylquercetin; 4′,7-Dimethoxy-3,3′,5-trihydroxyflavone

Identifiers
CAS Number	529-40-8
3D model (JSmol)	Interactive image
ChEBI	CHEBI:67493
ChemSpider	4478412
PubChem CID	5320287
UNII	Z3K3F0YR3W
CompTox Dashboard (EPA)	DTXSID00200942
- InChI: InChI=1S/C17H14O7/c1-22-9-6-11(19)14-13(7-9)24-17(16(21)15(14)20)8-3-4-12(23-2)10(18)5-8/h3-7,18-19,21H,1-2H3 Key: BWORNNDZQGOKBY-UHFFFAOYSA-N; InChI=1/C17H14O7/c1-22-9-6-11(19)14-13(7-9)24-17(16(21)15(14)20)8-3-4-12(23-2)10(18)5-8/h3-7,18-19,21H,1-2H3 Key: BWORNNDZQGOKBY-UHFFFAOYAW
- SMILES: COC1=C(C=C(C=C1)C2=C(C(=O)C3=C(C=C(C=C3O2)OC)O)O)O

Properties
Chemical formula	C_{17}H_{14}O_{7}
Molar mass	330.29 g/mol
- Except where otherwise noted, data are given for materials in their standard state (at 25 °C [77 °F], 100 kPa). verify (what is ?) Infobox references

Ombuin is an O-methylated flavonol, a type of flavonoid. It is the 4',7-O-methyl derivative of quercetin.

Ombuin can be found in species of the genus Erythroxylum. It can also be synthesized. Ombuin 3-sulfate can be isolated from Flaveria chlorifolia.

== Glycosides ==
Ombuin-3-rutinoside can be isolated from Phytolacca dioica, the ombu tree. Ombuin-3-O-rhamnosylglucoside can be found in Erythroxylum rufum.
Other glycosides (ombuosides) :

- Ombuin 3-galactoside (C_{23}H_{24}O_{12}, CAS number 69168-13-4)
- Ombuin 3-glucoside (C_{23}H_{24}O_{12}, CAS number 158642-42-3)
