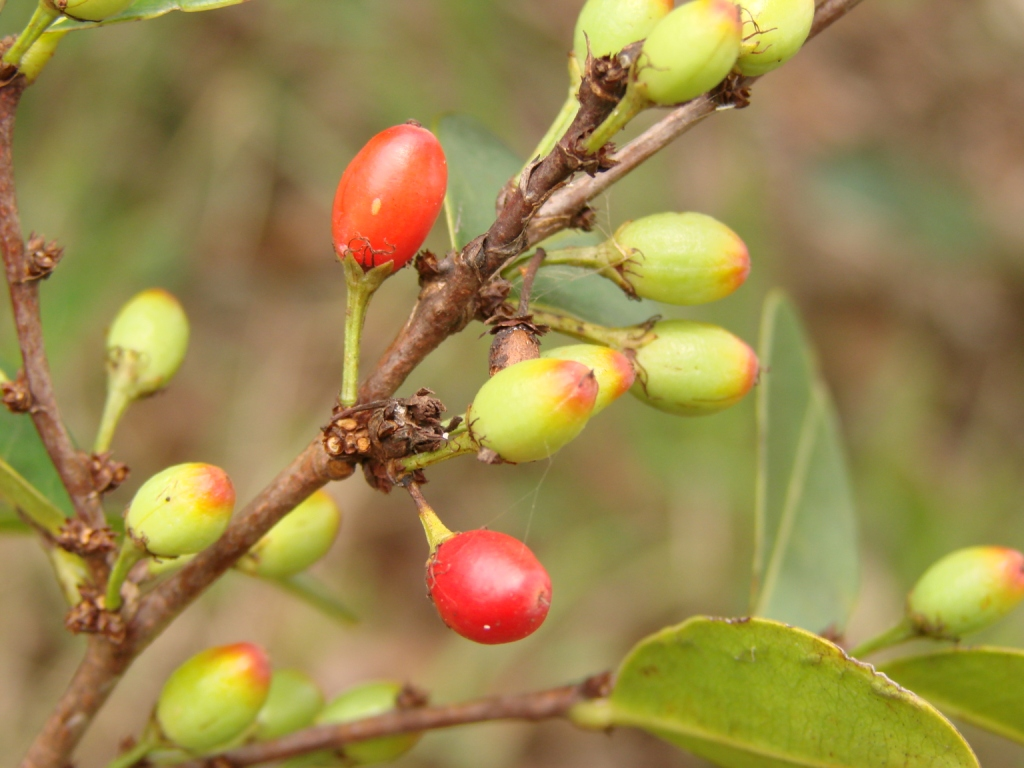
- In Brazil

Scientific classification
- Kingdom: Plantae
- Clade: Tracheophytes
- Clade: Angiosperms
- Clade: Eudicots
- Clade: Rosids
- Order: Malpighiales
- Family: Erythroxylaceae
- Genus: Erythroxylum
- Species: E. deciduum

Binomial name
- Erythroxylum deciduum A.St-Hil.

= Erythroxylum deciduum =

Species of plant

Erythroxylum deciduum is a species of flowering plant in the family Erythroxylaceae. It is native to Peru, Brazil, and northeast Argentina.

== Description ==
Erythroxylum deciduum is a deciduous perennial shrub with small, cream to pale yellow flowers and alternate leaves. It grows in dry tropical regions and its flowers are adapted for insect pollination.
