= Erythroxylum socotranum =

Conservation status
- Endangered (IUCN 3.1)

Scientific classification
- Kingdom: Plantae
- Clade: Tracheophytes
- Clade: Angiosperms
- Clade: Eudicots
- Clade: Rosids
- Order: Malpighiales
- Family: Erythroxylaceae
- Genus: Erythroxylum
- Species: E. socotranum

Binomial name
- Erythroxylum socotranum Thulin

Species of flowering plant

Erythroxylum socotranum is a species of plant. It is a part of the Erythroxylaceae family. It is endemic to southwestern Socotra in Yemen. Its natural habitat is rocky areas and is threatened by habitat loss.
