= Erythroxylum minutifolium =

Conservation status
- Extinct in the Wild (IUCN 2.3)

Scientific classification
- Kingdom: Plantae
- Clade: Tracheophytes
- Clade: Angiosperms
- Clade: Eudicots
- Clade: Rosids
- Order: Malpighiales
- Family: Erythroxylaceae
- Genus: Erythroxylum
- Species: E. minutifolium

Binomial name
- Erythroxylum minutifolium Griseb.

Synonyms
- Erythroxylum barahonense O.E.Schulz & Ekman; Erythroxylum echinodendron Ekman ex Urb.; Erythroxylum minutifolium var. cubense O.E.Schulz

Extinct species of flowering plant

Erythroxylum minutifolium is a species of flowering plant in the family Erythroxylaceae. It is a shrub native to Cuba and possibly Hispaniola.

Erythroxylum minutifolium is considered a very abundant plant in Cuba, however the IUCN Red List lists the species' synonym Erythroxylum echinodendron as extinct in the wild.

According to Plants of the World Online E. minutifolium is native to both Cuba and Hispaniola. Other sources describe it as endemic to Cuba. According to R. O. Prieto specimens of E. minutifolium collected in Hispaniola are actually of Erythroxylum williamsii which have been misidentified.

== Sources ==
- IUCN Red List of all Threatened Species
