= Tropane =

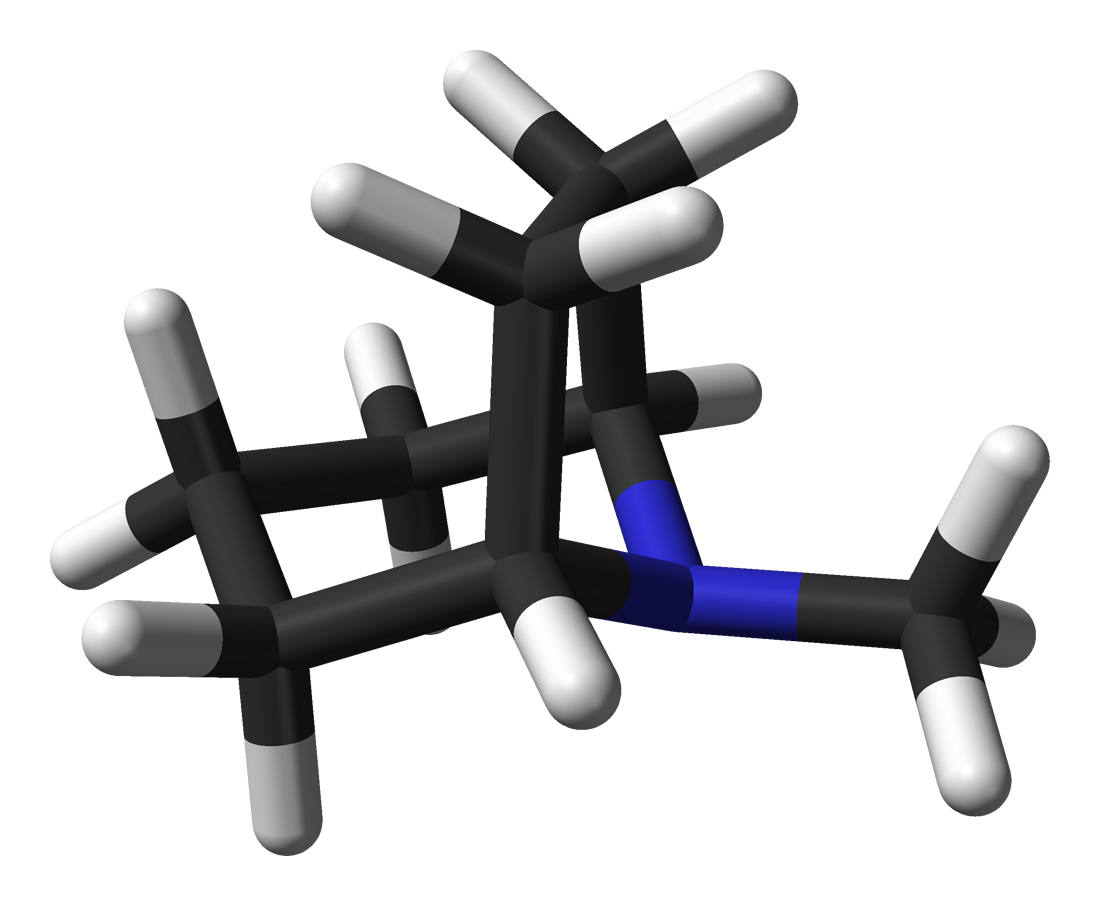

Names
- IUPAC name N-Methyl-8-azabicyclo[3.2.1]octane
- Other names 2,3-Dihydro-8-methylnortropidine

Identifiers
CAS Number	529-17-9
3D model (JSmol)	Interactive image
Beilstein Reference	6379695
ChEBI	CHEBI:35615
ChemSpider	553556
ECHA InfoCard	100.156.627
EC Number	628-350-5
PubChem CID	637986
UNII	62QFG0728A
CompTox Dashboard (EPA)	DTXSID50879243
- InChI: InChI=1S/C8H15N/c1-9-7-3-2-4-8(9)6-5-7/h7-8H,2-6H2,1H3/t7-,8+ Key: XLRPYZSEQKXZAA-OCAPTIKFSA-N; InChI=1S/C8H15N/c1-9-7-3-2-4-8(9)6-5-7/h7-8H,2-6H2,1H3/t7-,8+ Key: XLRPYZSEQKXZAA-OCAPTIKFBA; Key: XLRPYZSEQKXZAA-OCAPTIKFSA-N
- SMILES: N1(C)[C@H]2CC[C@@H]1CCC2

Properties
Chemical formula	C_{8}H_{15}N
Molar mass	125.211 g/mol
Density	0.9259 at 15 °C
Boiling point	163 to 169 °C (325 to 336 °F; 436 to 442 K)
- Except where otherwise noted, data are given for materials in their standard state (at 25 °C [77 °F], 100 kPa). verify (what is ?) Infobox references

Tropane is a nitrogenous bicyclic organic compound. It is mainly known for the other alkaloids derived from it, which include atropine and cocaine, among others. Tropane alkaloids occur in plants of the families Erythroxylaceae (including coca) and Solanaceae (including mandrake, henbane, deadly nightshade, datura, potato, tomato).

Structurally, tropane is cycloheptane with a nitrogen bridge between carbons 1 and 5 and an additional methyl group attached to the nitrogen. While carbons 1 and 5 are asymmetric carbons, tropane itself is optically inactive due to mirror symmetry.

8-Azabicyclo[3.2.1]octane (tropane without the N-methyl group) is known as nortropane or nor-tropane.

== See also ==
- Phenyltropane
- Tropane alkaloid
- Tropine
