= E. macrophyllum =

E. macrophyllum may refer to:

- Erodium macrophyllum, synonym of California macrophylla, a flowering plant species native to the southwestern United States and northern Mexico
- Erythroxylum macrophyllum, a tropical tree species found in Costa Rica
