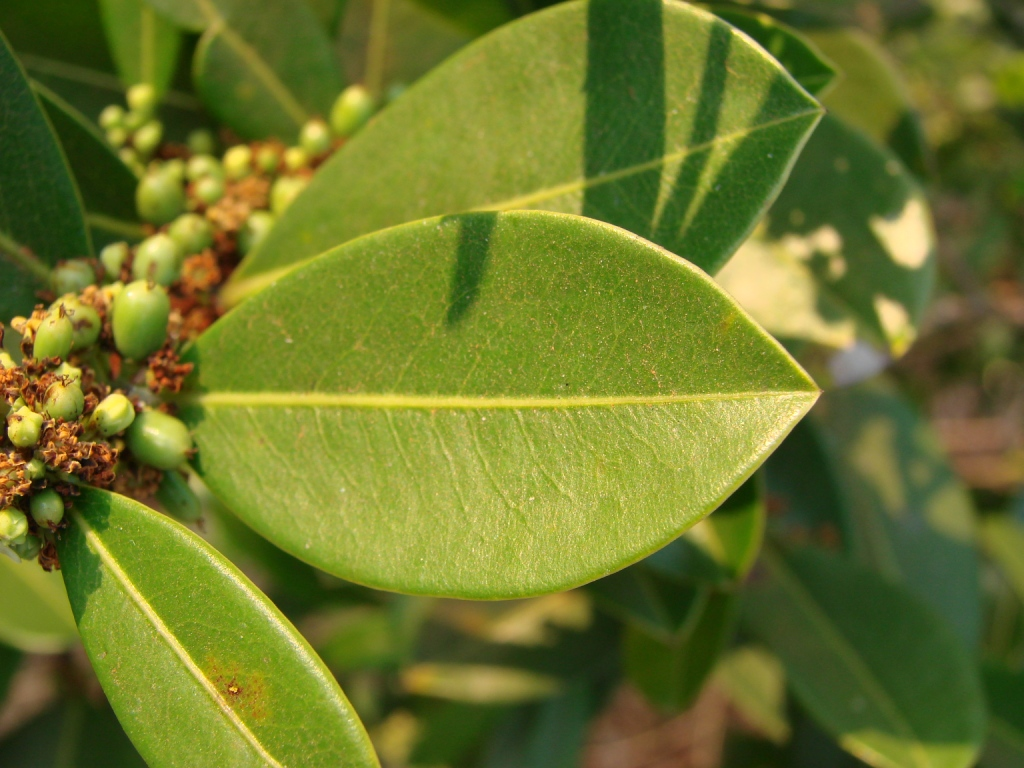

Scientific classification
- Kingdom: Plantae
- Clade: Tracheophytes
- Clade: Angiosperms
- Clade: Eudicots
- Clade: Rosids
- Order: Malpighiales
- Family: Erythroxylaceae
- Genus: Erythroxylum
- Species: E. citrifolium

Binomial name
- Erythroxylum citrifolium A.St.-Hil.

= Erythroxylum citrifolium =

Species of flowering plant

Erythroxylum citrifolium is a species of flowering plant in the family Erythroxylaceae. It is native to Central and South America.

== Description ==
The leaves are narrow, elliptical, and deep green, resembling that of a lemon. It produces small, inconspicuous cream or greenish-white flowers. Once pollinated, it produces small, red berries.
