= Erythroxylum grisebachii =

Scientific classification
- Kingdom: Plantae
- Clade: Tracheophytes
- Clade: Angiosperms
- Clade: Eudicots
- Clade: Rosids
- Order: Malpighiales
- Family: Erythroxylaceae
- Genus: Erythroxylum
- Species: E. grisebachii

Binomial name
- Erythroxylum grisebachii Peyr.

Species of plant

Erythroxylum grisebachii is a species of flowering plant in the family Erythroxylaceae. It is native to Suriname.
