= Erythroxylum platyclados =

Scientific classification
- Kingdom: Plantae
- Clade: Tracheophytes
- Clade: Angiosperms
- Clade: Eudicots
- Clade: Rosids
- Order: Malpighiales
- Family: Erythroxylaceae
- Genus: Erythroxylum
- Species: E. platyclados

Binomial name
- Erythroxylum platyclados Bojer

Synonyms
- Erythroxylum acranthum Hemsl.; Erythroxylum crassipes Baill.; Erythroxylum pulchellum Engl.

Species of plant

Erythroxylum platyclados, synonyms including Erythroxylum acranthum, is a species of flowering plant in the family Erythroxylaceae, native to parts of eastern Africa and the islands of Aldabra and Comoros. It grows as a tree or shrub. It was first described by Wenceslas Bojer in 1842.

== Distribution and habitat ==
Erythroxylum platyclados is native to Aldabra in Seychelles, the Comoros, Kenya, Madagascar, Mozambique and Tanzania. It mainly grows in seasonally dry tropical habitats.

== Conservation ==
Erythroxylum acranthum was assessed as "vulnerable" in the 1998 IUCN Red List, where it is said to be native only to the Seychelles. As of February 2023, E. acranthum was regarded as a synonym of Erythroxylum platyclados, which has a much wider distribution.
