= Erythroxylum ecarinatum =

Scientific classification
- Kingdom: Plantae
- Clade: Tracheophytes
- Clade: Angiosperms
- Clade: Eudicots
- Clade: Rosids
- Order: Malpighiales
- Family: Erythroxylaceae
- Genus: Erythroxylum
- Species: E. ecarinatum

Binomial name
- Erythroxylum ecarinatum Hochr.

Species of flowering plant

Erythroxylum ecarinatum is a Southwest Pacific and Australian species of Erythroxylum.

It is an Australian rainforest timber tree locally called "brown plum".
