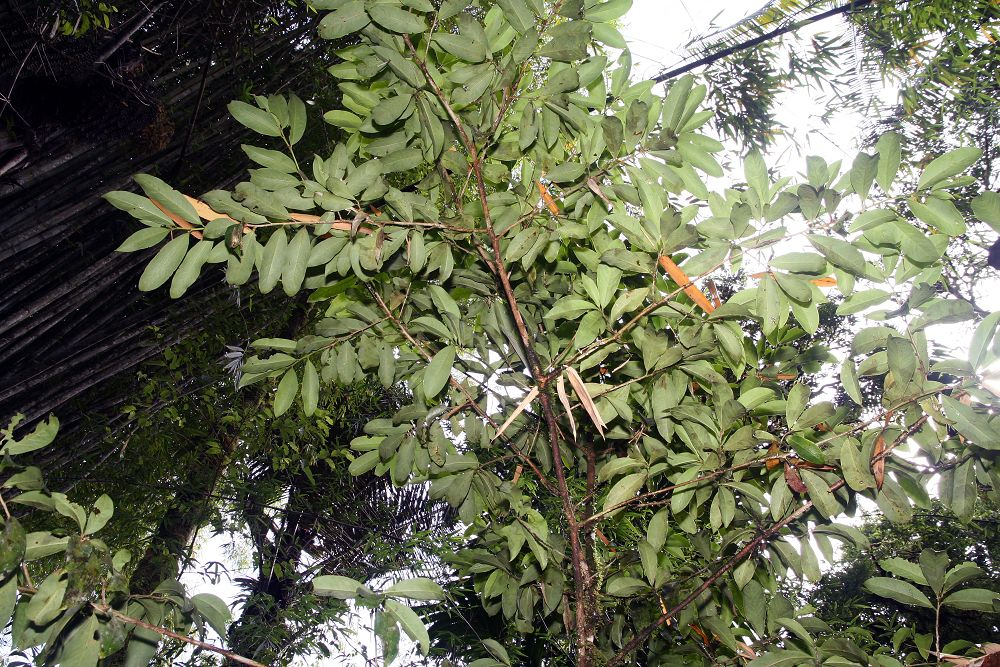

Conservation status
- Least Concern (IUCN 3.1)

Scientific classification
- Kingdom: Plantae
- Clade: Tracheophytes
- Clade: Angiosperms
- Clade: Eudicots
- Clade: Rosids
- Order: Malpighiales
- Family: Erythroxylaceae
- Genus: Erythroxylum
- Species: E. macrophyllum

Binomial name
- Erythroxylum macrophyllum Cav.

= Erythroxylum macrophyllum =

Species of tree

Erythroxylum macrophyllum is a tropical tree in the family Erythroxylaceae. It is found in Costa Rica. It grows at altitudes of 1200–1400 m. It is a small tree of the understory reaching 2 to 6 meters. The leaves are alternate and are aligned in a plane. Small white flowers are borne March through June; they are followed by fruit that persist until September and are red when ripe.

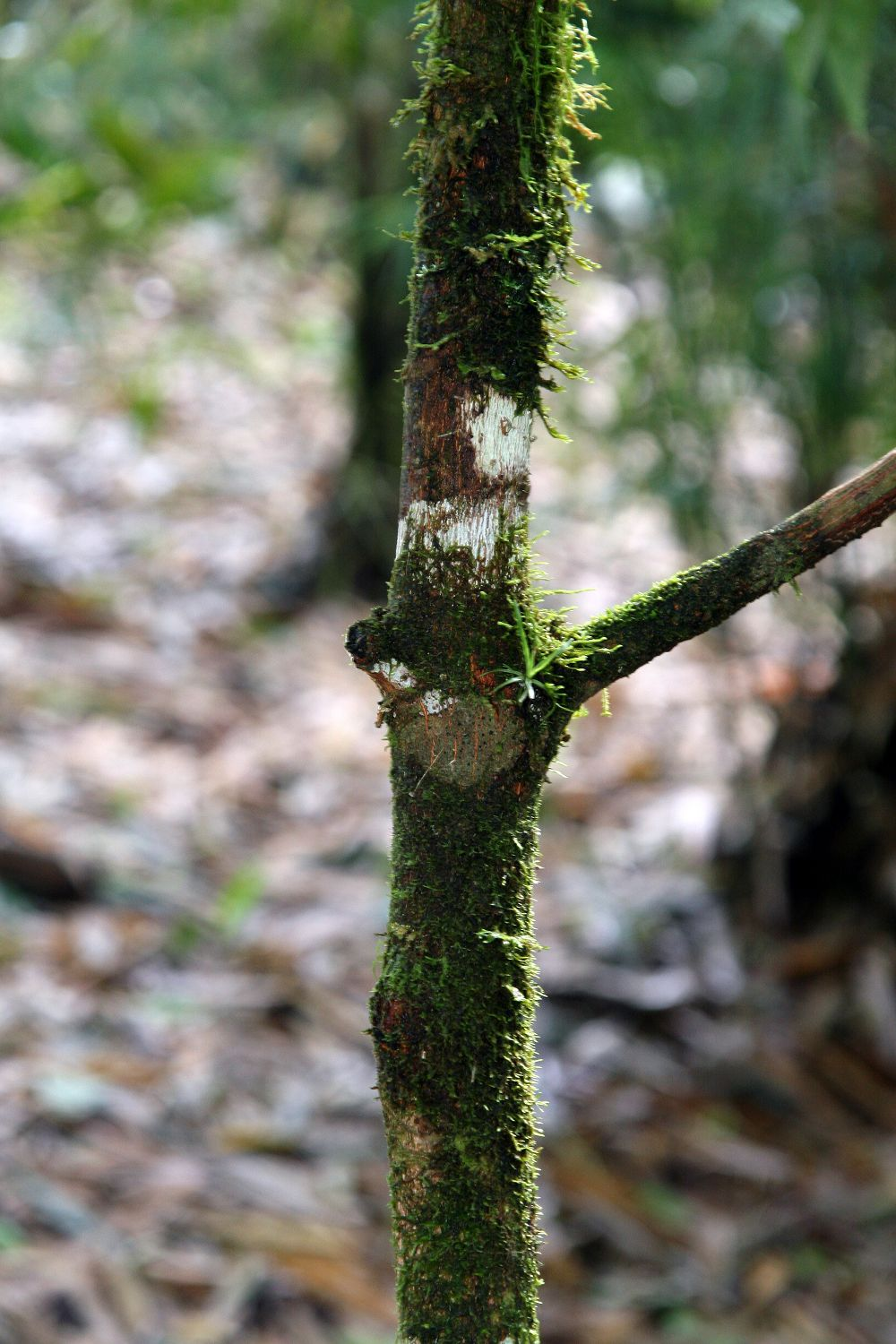

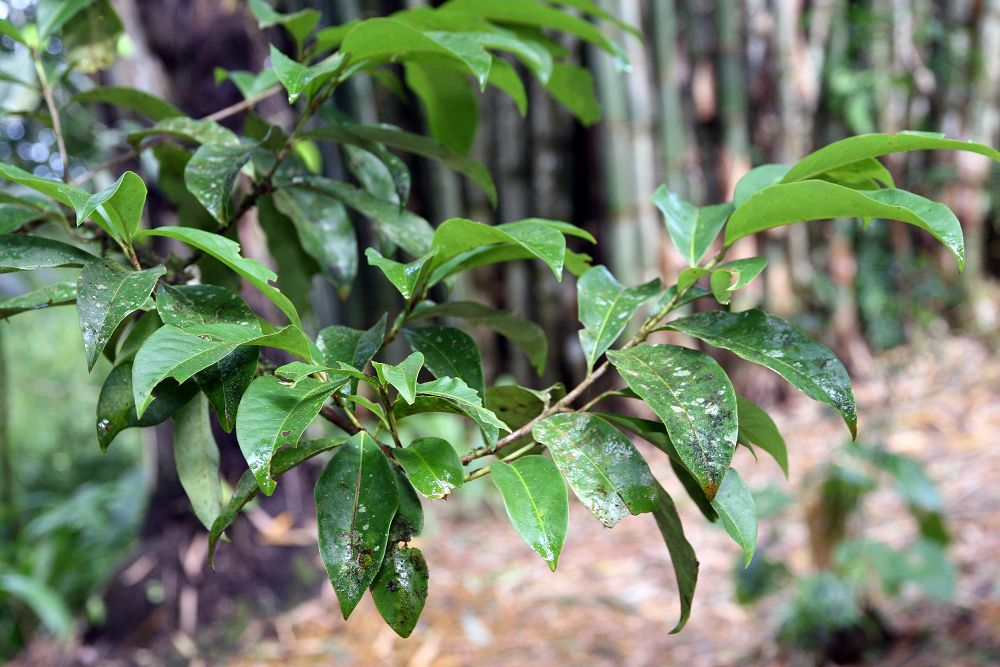

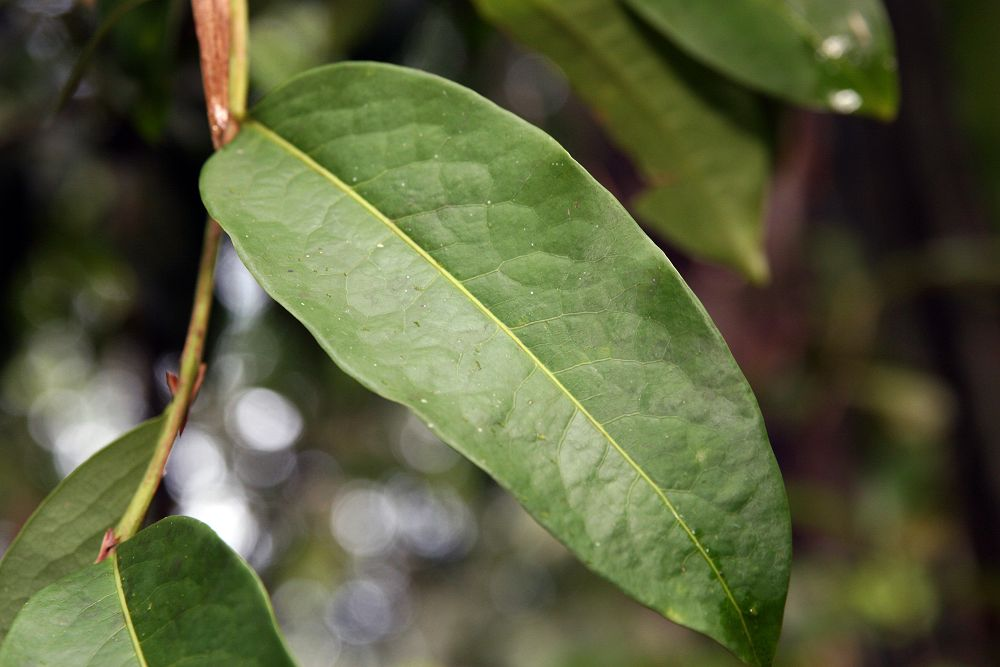
