= Pinacopodium =

Scientific classification
- Kingdom: Plantae
- Clade: Tracheophytes
- Clade: Angiosperms
- Clade: Eudicots
- Clade: Rosids
- Order: Malpighiales
- Family: Erythroxylaceae
- Genus: Pinacopodium; Exell & Mendonça

Synonyms
- Morelodendron Cavaco & Normand

Genus of plants

Pinacopodium is a genus of flowering plants belonging to the family Erythroxylaceae.

Its native range is Western Central Tropical Africa.

Species:

- Pinacopodium congolense (S.Moore) Exell & Mendonça
- Pinacopodium gabonense (Cavaco & Normand) Normand & Cavaco
