= Aneulophus =

Scientific classification
- Kingdom: Plantae
- Clade: Tracheophytes
- Clade: Angiosperms
- Clade: Eudicots
- Clade: Rosids
- Order: Malpighiales
- Family: Erythroxylaceae
- Genus: Aneulophus; Benth.

Genus of flowering plants

Aneulophus is a genus of flowering plants belonging to the family Erythroxylaceae.

Its native range is Western Central Tropical Africa.

Species:

- Aneulophus africanus Benth.
- Aneulophus congoensis Gram
