= Erythroxylum ellipticum =

Scientific classification
- Kingdom: Plantae
- Clade: Tracheophytes
- Clade: Angiosperms
- Clade: Eudicots
- Clade: Rosids
- Order: Malpighiales
- Family: Erythroxylaceae
- Genus: Erythroxylum
- Species: E. ellipticum

Binomial name
- Erythroxylum ellipticum R.Br. ex Benth.

Species of flowering plant

Erythroxylum ellipticum is a Northern Australian species of Erythroxylum. It grows as a shrub or tree.

It is locally known as kerosene wood or turpentine tree - because its green branches and twigs burn readily.

The shrub or tree typically grows to a height of 1 to 5 m (3 ft 3 in to 16 ft 5 in) and produces white-green flowers around November.

It is found on rocky hillsides and in creek beds growing in sandstone based soils in the Kimberley region of Western Australia and extending across the top end of the Northern Territory and on parts of Cape York Peninsula in Queensland.
