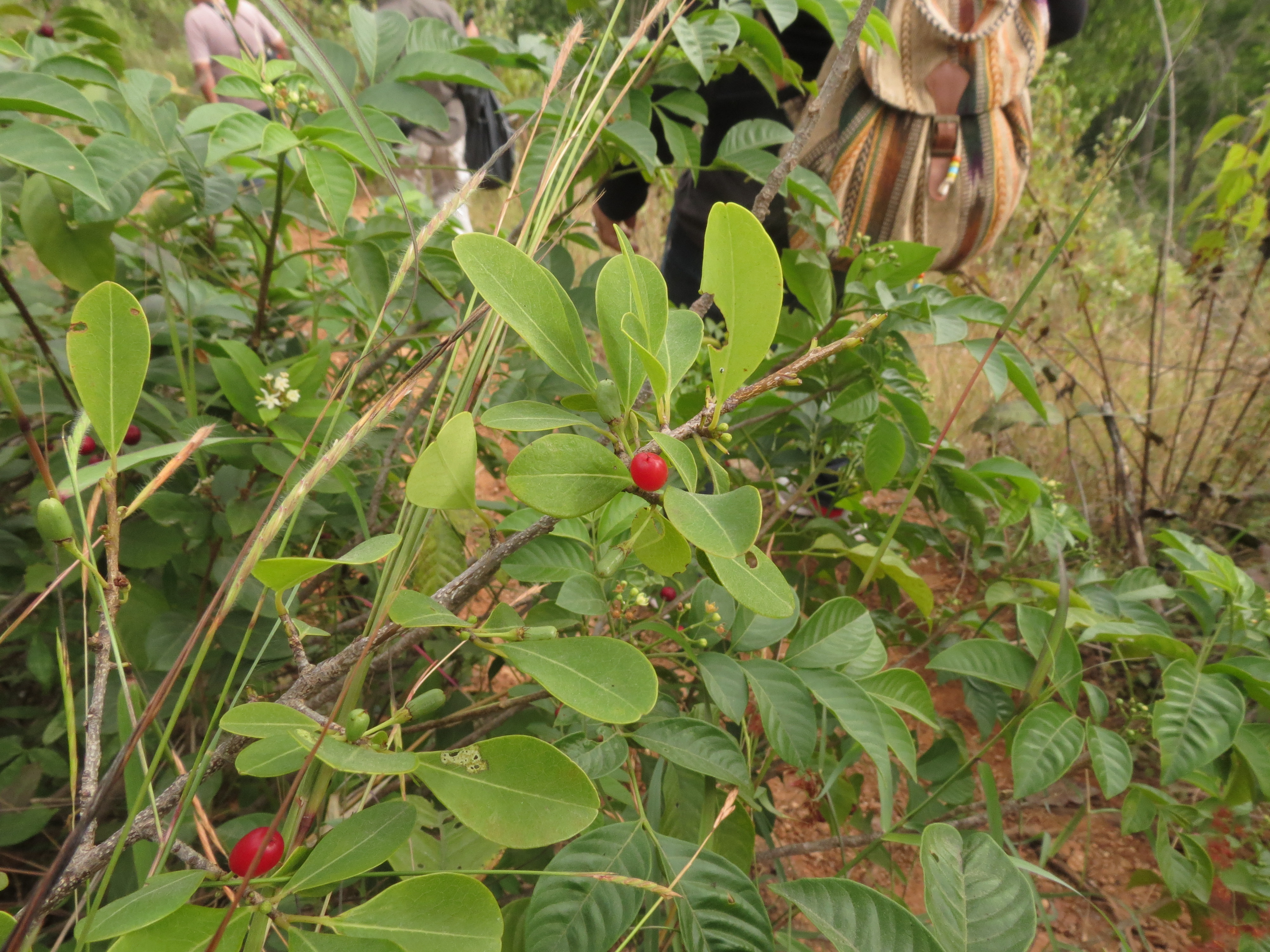

Scientific classification
- Kingdom: Plantae
- Clade: Embryophytes
- Clade: Tracheophytes
- Clade: Angiosperms
- Clade: Eudicots
- Clade: Rosids
- Order: Malpighiales
- Family: Erythroxylaceae
- Genus: Erythroxylum
- Species: E. monogynum

Binomial name
- Erythroxylum monogynum Roxb.

Synonyms
- Erythroxylum indicum (DC.) Elliot; Erythroxylum sideroxyloides Roxb. [Illegitimate]; Sethia indica DC.

= Erythroxylum monogynum =

Species of tree

Erythroxylum monogynum, the bastard sandal or red cedar, is a tropical tree in the family Erythroxylaceae. It is native to Peninsular India and Sri Lanka. It is a small, evergreen bushy tree reaching 7 m (23 ft) (but sometimes higher). The leaves are simple and alternate. Small white flowers are bisexual with 5–6 sepals, borne March through June; Fruit is a one-seeded drupe. Flowering and fruiting occur throughout the year. The plant is known to have high medicinal value. It is taken to cure many diseases such as stomachache, dyspepsia, fever, and dropsy in Ayurvedic medicine.
