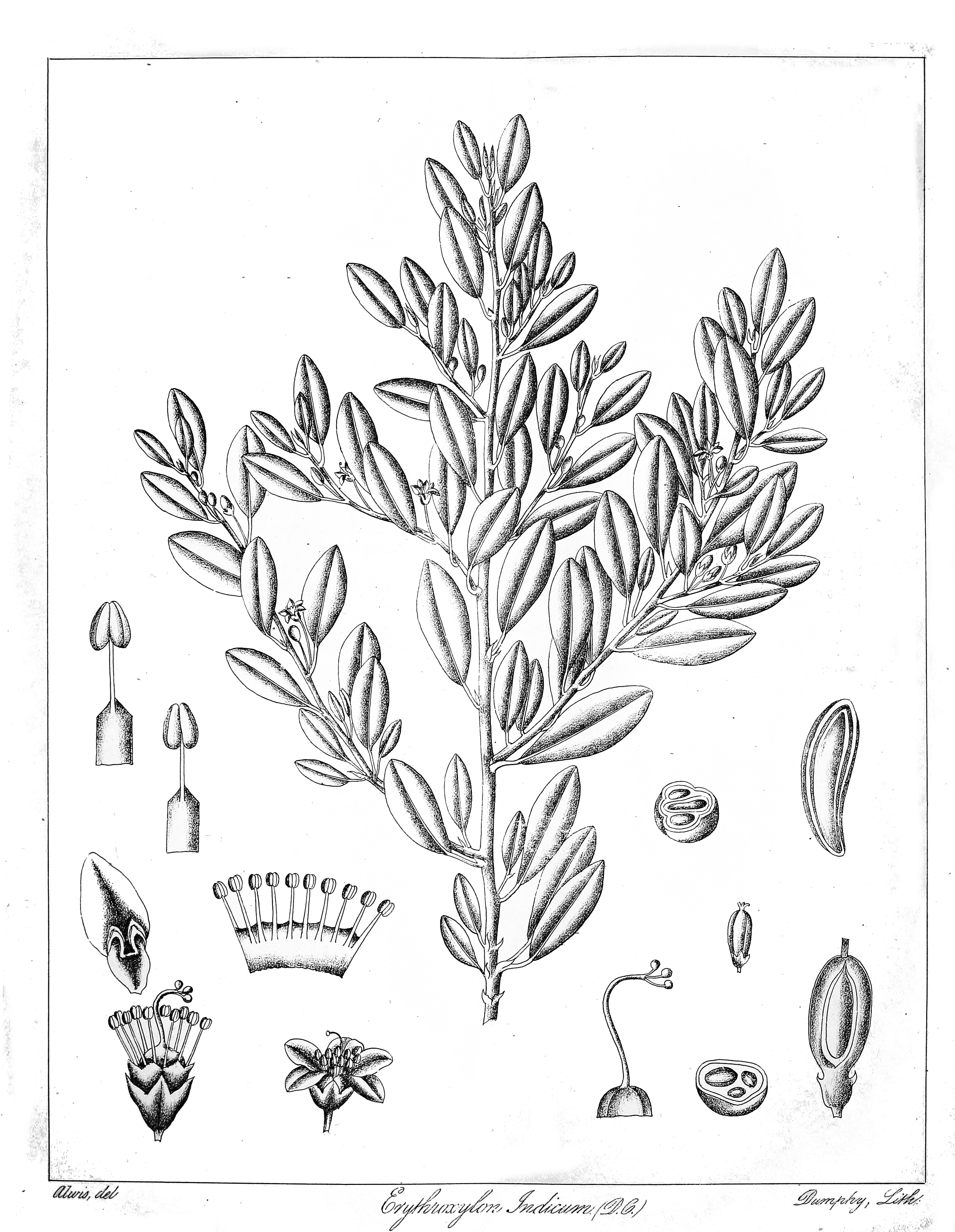
- Erythroxylum monogynum

Scientific classification
- Kingdom: Plantae
- Clade: Tracheophytes
- Clade: Angiosperms
- Clade: Eudicots
- Clade: Rosids
- Order: Malpighiales
- Family: Erythroxylaceae
- Genus: Erythroxylum; P. Browne, 1756

Species
- 250+, see text

Synonyms
- Erythroxylon L.

= Erythroxylum =

Genus of flowering plants

Erythroxylum is a genus of tropical flowering plants in the family Erythroxylaceae. Many of the approximately 200 species contain the tropane alkaloid cocaine, and two of the species within this genus, Erythroxylum coca and Erythroxylum novogranatense, both native to South America, are the main commercial source of cocaine and of the mild stimulant coca tea. Another species, Erythroxylum vaccinifolium (also known as catuaba) is used as an aphrodisiac in Brazilian drinks and herbal medicine. Erythroxylum australe was traditionally used by Aboriginal Australians for rites and other practices.

== Species ==
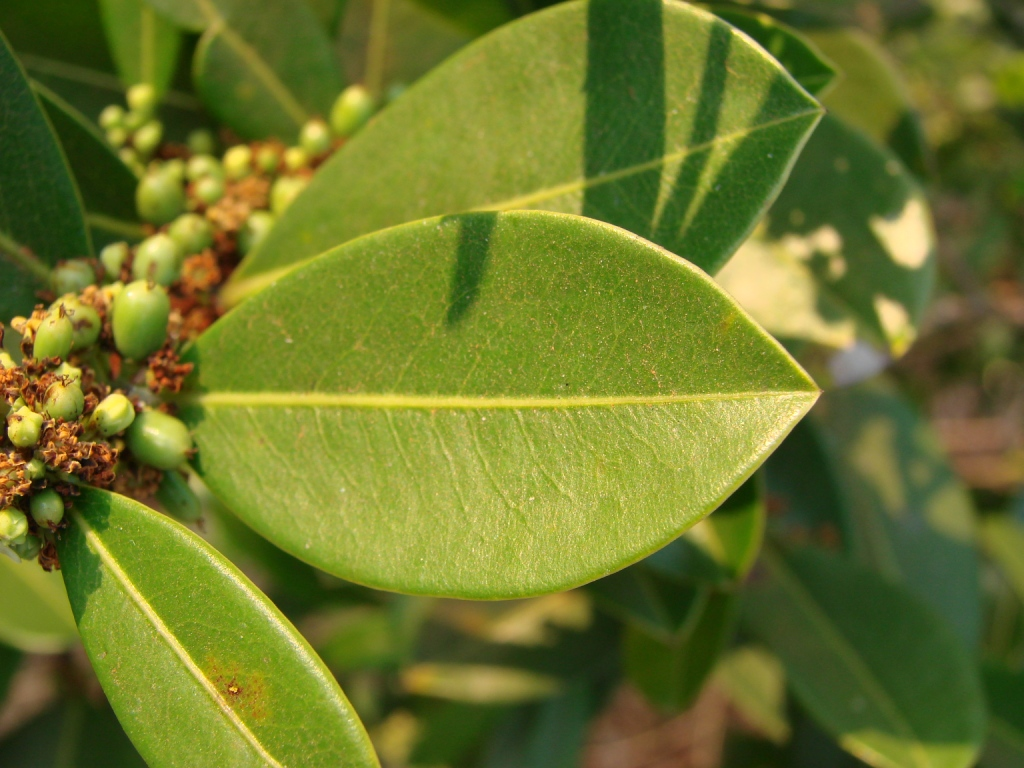
Erythroxylum citrifolium

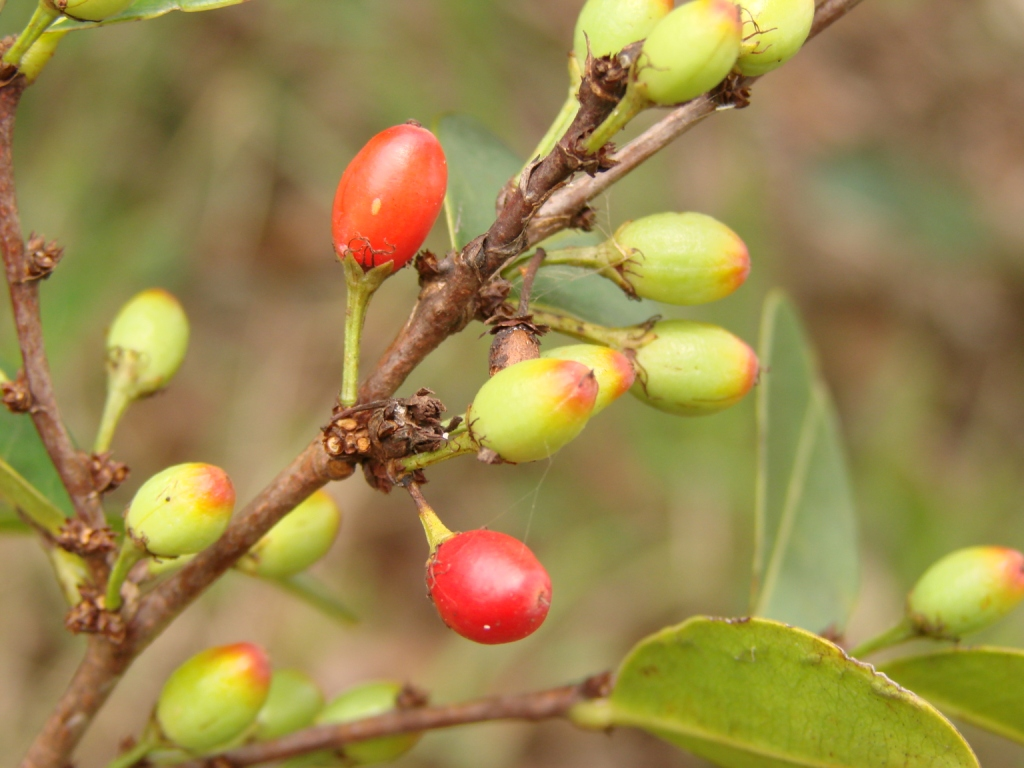
Fruits of Erythroxylum deciduum

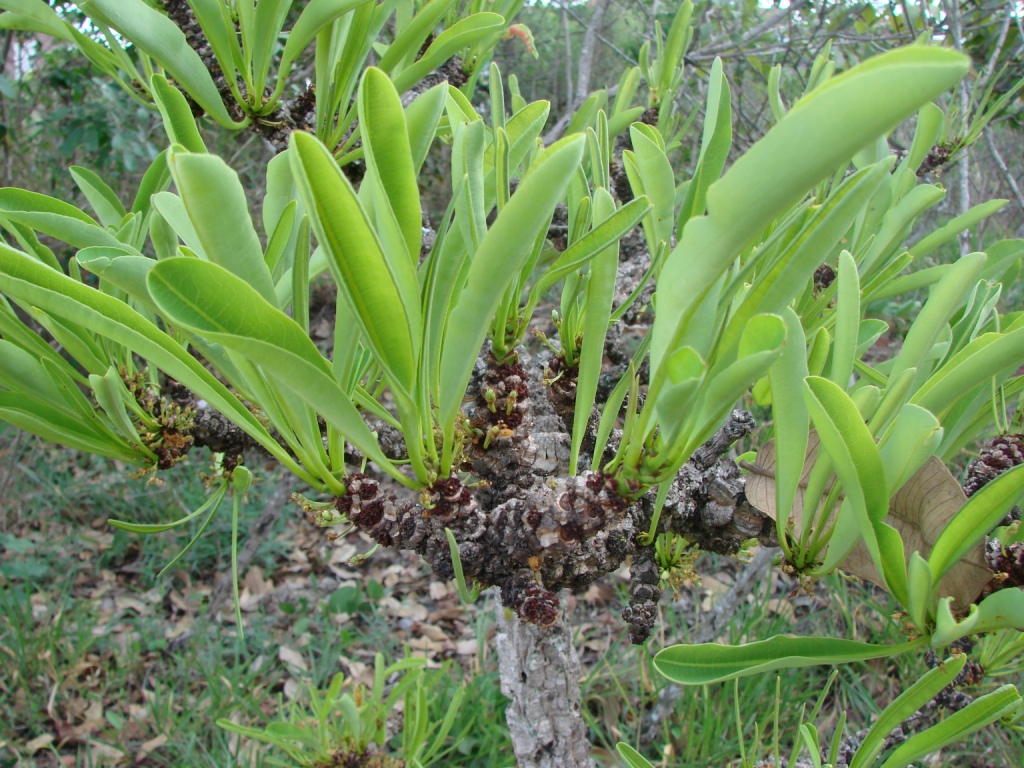
Erythroxylum tortuosum

As of 2021, Kew's Plants of the World Online listed 259 species:

- Erythroxylum acrobeles W.A.Gentner
- Erythroxylum acuminatum Ruiz & Pav.
- Erythroxylum acutum W.A.Gentner
- Erythroxylum affine A.St.-Hil.
- Erythroxylum alaternifolium A.Rich.
- Erythroxylum amazonicum Peyr.
- Erythroxylum amplifolium Baill.
- Erythroxylum amplum Benth.
- Erythroxylum ampullaceum Baker
- Erythroxylum anceps O.E.Schulz
- Erythroxylum andrei Plowman
- Erythroxylum angelicae Loiola
- Erythroxylum anguifugum Mart.
- Erythroxylum annamense Tardieu
- Erythroxylum apiculatum Diogo
- Erythroxylum areolatum L.
- Erythroxylum argentinum O.E.Schulz
- Erythroxylum armatum Oviedo & Borhidi
- Erythroxylum arrojadoi O.E.Schulz
- Erythroxylum australe F.Muell.
- Erythroxylum ayrtonianum Loiola & M.F.Sales
- Erythroxylum badium O.E.Schulz
- Erythroxylum banaoense Oviedo
- Erythroxylum bangii Rusby
- Erythroxylum baracoense Borhidi
- Erythroxylum barbatum O.E.Schulz
- Erythroxylum bequaertii Standl.
- Erythroxylum betulaceum Mart.
- Erythroxylum bezerrae Plowman
- Erythroxylum bicolor O.E.Schulz
- Erythroxylum boinense H.Perrier
- Erythroxylum boivinianum Baill.
- Erythroxylum bradeanum O.E.Schulz
- Erythroxylum brennae D'Arcy & Schanen
- Erythroxylum brevipes DC.
- Erythroxylum buxifolium Lam.
- Erythroxylum buxus Peyr.
- Erythroxylum caatingae Plowman
- Erythroxylum calyptratum Komada & Tagane
- Erythroxylum cambodianum Pierre
- Erythroxylum campestre A.St.-Hil.
- Erythroxylum campinense Amaral
- Erythroxylum carajasense (Plowman) Costa-Lima
- Erythroxylum carthagenense Jacq.
- Erythroxylum cassinoides Planch. & Linden
- Erythroxylum cataractarum Spruce ex Peyr.
- Erythroxylum catharinense Amaral
- Erythroxylum cincinnatum Mart.
- Erythroxylum citrifolium A.St.-Hil.
- Erythroxylum clarense Borhidi
- Erythroxylum coca Lam.
- Erythroxylum coelophlebium Mart.
- Erythroxylum cogolloi Jara
- Erythroxylum columbinum Mart.
- Erythroxylum compressum Peyr.
- Erythroxylum confusum Britton
- Erythroxylum cordato-ovatum Huber
- Erythroxylum coriaceum Britton & P.Wilson
- Erythroxylum corymbosum Boivin ex Baill.
- Erythroxylum couveleense Guillaumin
- Erythroxylum cuneatum (Miq.) Kurz
- Erythroxylum cuneifolium (Mart.) O.E.Schulz
- Erythroxylum cuspidifolium Mart.
- Erythroxylum daphnites Mart.
- Erythroxylum davidii D'Arcy & Schanen
- Erythroxylum deciduum A.St.-Hil.
- Erythroxylum dekindtii (Engl.) O.E.Schulz
- Erythroxylum delagoense Schinz
- Erythroxylum densum Rusby
- Erythroxylum dillonii Plowman ex Jara
- Erythroxylum discolor Bojer
- Erythroxylum distortum Mart.
- Erythroxylum divaricatum Peyr.
- Erythroxylum domingense Oviedo
- Erythroxylum dumosum Alain
- Erythroxylum ecarinatum Hochr.
- Erythroxylum elegans Baill.
- Erythroxylum ellipticum R.Br. ex Benth.
- Erythroxylum emarginatum Thonn.
- Erythroxylum engleri O.E.Schulz
- Erythroxylum ferrugineum Cav.
- Erythroxylum fimbriatum Peyr.
- Erythroxylum firmum Baker
- Erythroxylum fischeri Engl.
- Erythroxylum flavicans Borhidi
- Erythroxylum foetidum Plowman
- Erythroxylum frangulifolium A.St.-Hil.
- Erythroxylum gaudichaudii Peyr.
- Erythroxylum gentryi Jara
- Erythroxylum gerrardii Baker
- Erythroxylum glaucum O.E.Schulz
- Erythroxylum glaziovii O.E.Schulz
- Erythroxylum gonoclados (Mart.) O.E.Schulz
- Erythroxylum gracile O.E.Schulz
- Erythroxylum gracilipes Peyr.
- Erythroxylum grandifolium Peyr.
- Erythroxylum grisebachii Peyr.
- Erythroxylum guanchezii Plowman
- Erythroxylum guatemalense Lundell
- Erythroxylum hamigerum O.E.Schulz
- Erythroxylum haughtii W.A.Gentner
- Erythroxylum havanense Jacq.
- Erythroxylum hildebrandtii O.E.Schulz
- Erythroxylum hondense Kunth
- Erythroxylum horridum Borhidi & Oviedo
- Erythroxylum hypericifolium Lam.
- Erythroxylum hypoleucum Plowman
- Erythroxylum impressum O.E.Schulz
- Erythroxylum incrassatum O.E.Schulz
- Erythroxylum jaimei Jara
- Erythroxylum jamaicense Fawc. & Rendle
- Erythroxylum kapplerianum Peyr.
- Erythroxylum kochummenii Ng
- Erythroxylum laetevirens O.E.Schulz
- Erythroxylum lanceolatum (Wight) Walp.
- Erythroxylum lanceum Bojer
- Erythroxylum lancifolium Peyr.
- Erythroxylum laurel Baill.
- Erythroxylum laurifolium Lam.
- Erythroxylum leal-costae Plowman
- Erythroxylum leandrianum Payens
- Erythroxylum lenticellosum Huber
- Erythroxylum leptoneurum O.E.Schulz
- Erythroxylum ligustrinum DC.
- Erythroxylum lindemanii Plowman
- Erythroxylum lineolatum DC.
- Erythroxylum loefgrenii Diogo
- Erythroxylum longipes O.E.Schulz
- Erythroxylum longisetulosum Loiola & M.F.Sales
- Erythroxylum loretense Plowman
- Erythroxylum lygoides O.E.Schulz
- Erythroxylum macrocalyx Mart.
- Erythroxylum macrocarpum O.E.Schulz
- Erythroxylum macrochaetum Miq.
- Erythroxylum macrophyllum Cav.
- Erythroxylum magnoliifolium A.St.-Hil.
- Erythroxylum mamacoca Mart.
- Erythroxylum mangorense H.Perrier
- Erythroxylum mannii Oliv.
- Erythroxylum maracasense Plowman
- Erythroxylum martii Peyr.
- Erythroxylum mattos-silvae Plowman
- Erythroxylum membranaceum Plowman
- Erythroxylum mexicanum Kunth
- Erythroxylum microphyllum A.St.-Hil.
- Erythroxylum mikanii Peyr.
- Erythroxylum minutifolium Griseb.
- Erythroxylum mocquerysii DC.
- Erythroxylum mogotense Oviedo
- Erythroxylum monogynum Roxb.
- Erythroxylum moonii Hochr.
- Erythroxylum mucronatum Benth.
- Erythroxylum myrsinites Mart.
- Erythroxylum myrtoides Bojer
- Erythroxylum nelson-rosae Plowman
- Erythroxylum nitidulum Baker
- Erythroxylum nobile O.E.Schulz
- Erythroxylum nordestinum Costa-Lima, Loiola & M.Alves
- Erythroxylum nossibeense Baill.
- Erythroxylum novocaledonicum O.E.Schulz
- Erythroxylum novogranatense (D.Morris) Hieron.
- Erythroxylum nummularia Peyr.
- Erythroxylum obtusifolium (Wight) Hook.f.
- Erythroxylum occultum Plowman
- Erythroxylum ochranthum Mart.
- Erythroxylum opacum Rusby
- Erythroxylum oreophilum (O.E.Schulz ex Pilg.) Steyerm. & Maguire
- Erythroxylum orinocense Kunth
- Erythroxylum ovalifolium Peyr.
- Erythroxylum oxycarpum O.E.Schulz
- Erythroxylum oxypetalum O.E.Schulz
- Erythroxylum pachyneurum O.E.Schulz
- Erythroxylum pacificum D.R.Simpson
- Erythroxylum panamense Turcz.
- Erythroxylum paraguariense (Chodat & Hassl.) O.E.Schulz
- Erythroxylum parvistipulatum Peyr.
- Erythroxylum passerinum Mart.
- Erythroxylum patentissimum O.E.Schulz
- Erythroxylum pauciflorum Rusby
- Erythroxylum pauferrense Plowman
- Erythroxylum pedicellare (Griseb.) O.E.Schulz
- Erythroxylum pelleterianum A.St.-Hil.
- Erythroxylum pervillei Baill.
- Erythroxylum petrae-caballi Plowman
- Erythroxylum pictum E.Mey. ex Harv. & Sond.
- Erythroxylum platyclados Bojer
- Erythroxylum plowmanianum Cogollo & Pipoly
- Erythroxylum polygonoides Mart.
- Erythroxylum popayanense Kunth
- Erythroxylum pruinosum O.E.Schulz
- Erythroxylum pulchrum A.St.-Hil.
- Erythroxylum pungens O.E.Schulz
- Erythroxylum pyan Costa-Lima
- Erythroxylum pyrifolium Baker
- Erythroxylum raimondii O.E.Schulz
- Erythroxylum reticulatum Northr.
- Erythroxylum revolutum Mart.
- Erythroxylum rhodappendiculatum Costa-Lima
- Erythroxylum rignyanum Baill.
- Erythroxylum rimosum O.E.Schulz
- Erythroxylum riparium T.Araújo & Amorim
- Erythroxylum riverae Jara & J.D.García-Gonz.
- Erythroxylum roigii Britton & P.Wilson
- Erythroxylum roraimae Klotzsch ex O.E.Schulz
- Erythroxylum rosuliferum O.E.Schulz
- Erythroxylum rotundifolium Lunan
- Erythroxylum rufum Cav.
- Erythroxylum ruizii Peyr.
- Erythroxylum ruryi Plowman
- Erythroxylum santosii Plowman
- Erythroxylum sarawakanum R.C.K.Chung
- Erythroxylum schomburgkii Peyr.
- Erythroxylum schunkei Plowman
- Erythroxylum sechellarum O.E.Schulz
- Erythroxylum seyrigi H.Perrier
- Erythroxylum shatona J.F.Macbr.
- Erythroxylum sideroxyloides Lam.
- Erythroxylum simonis Plowman
- Erythroxylum sinense Y.C.Wu
- Erythroxylum sobraleanum Loiola & L.S.Cordeiro
- Erythroxylum socotranum Thulin
- Erythroxylum sparsiflorum Baker
- Erythroxylum sphaeranthum H.Perrier
- Erythroxylum splendidum Plowman
- Erythroxylum spruceanum Peyr.
- Erythroxylum squamatum Sw.
- Erythroxylum stenopetalum Costa-Lima
- Erythroxylum steyermarkii Plowman
- Erythroxylum stipulosum Plowman
- Erythroxylum striiflorum H.Perrier
- Erythroxylum striolatum O.E.Schulz
- Erythroxylum strobilaceum Peyr.
- Erythroxylum suberosum A.St.-Hil., A.Juss. & Cambess.
- Erythroxylum subglaucescens Mart. ex Peyr.
- Erythroxylum subracemosum Turcz.
- Erythroxylum subrotundum A.St.-Hil.
- Erythroxylum subsessile (Mart.) O.E.Schulz
- Erythroxylum substriatum O.E.Schulz
- Erythroxylum subumbellatum O.E.Schulz
- Erythroxylum tapacuranum Costa-Lima
- Erythroxylum tenue Plowman
- Erythroxylum tianguanum Plowman
- Erythroxylum timothei Loiola & M.F.Sales
- Erythroxylum tortuosum Mart.
- Erythroxylum tucuruiense Plowman
- Erythroxylum ulei O.E.Schulz
- Erythroxylum umbrosum Costa-Lima & M.Alves
- Erythroxylum umbu Costa-Lima
- Erythroxylum undulatum Plowman
- Erythroxylum urbanii O.E.Schulz
- Erythroxylum vaccinifolium Mart.
- Erythroxylum vaginatum O.E.Schulz
- Erythroxylum vasquezii Plowman
- Erythroxylum vernicosum O.E.Schulz
- Erythroxylum virgultosum Mart.
- Erythroxylum williamsii Standl. ex Plowman
- Erythroxylum xerophilum H.Perrier
- Erythroxylum zambesiacum N.Robson
- Erythroxylum zeylanicum O.E.Schulz

== Ecology ==
Erythroxylum species are food sources for the larvae of some butterflies and moths, including several Morpho species and Dalcera abrasa, which has been recorded on E. deciduum, and the species of Agrias.
