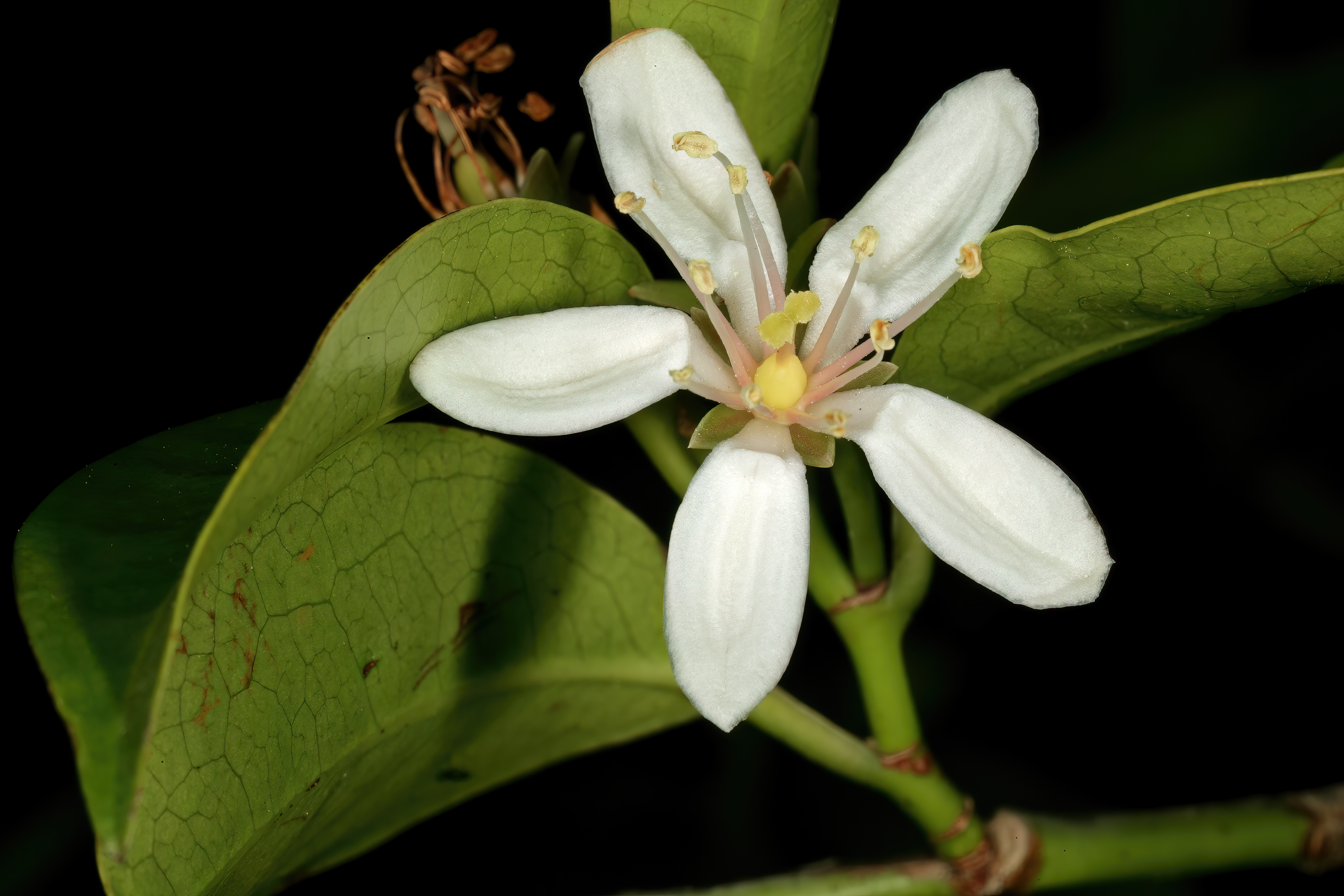
- Nectaropetalum zuluense

Scientific classification
- Kingdom: Plantae
- Clade: Tracheophytes
- Clade: Angiosperms
- Clade: Eudicots
- Clade: Rosids
- Order: Malpighiales
- Family: Erythroxylaceae
- Genus: Nectaropetalum; Engl.

= Nectaropetalum =

Genus of plants

Nectaropetalum is a genus of flowering plants belonging to the family Erythroxylaceae.

Its native range is Somalia to Southern Africa, and Madagascar.

== Species ==
Species:

- Nectaropetalum acuminatum Verdc.
- Nectaropetalum capense (Bolus) Stapf & Boodle
- Nectaropetalum carvalhoi Engl.
- Nectaropetalum eligulatum (H.Perrier) Bard.-Vauc.
- Nectaropetalum evrardii Bamps
- Nectaropetalum kaessneri Engl.
- Nectaropetalum lebrunii G.C.C.Gilbert
- Nectaropetalum zuluense (Schönland) Corbishley
