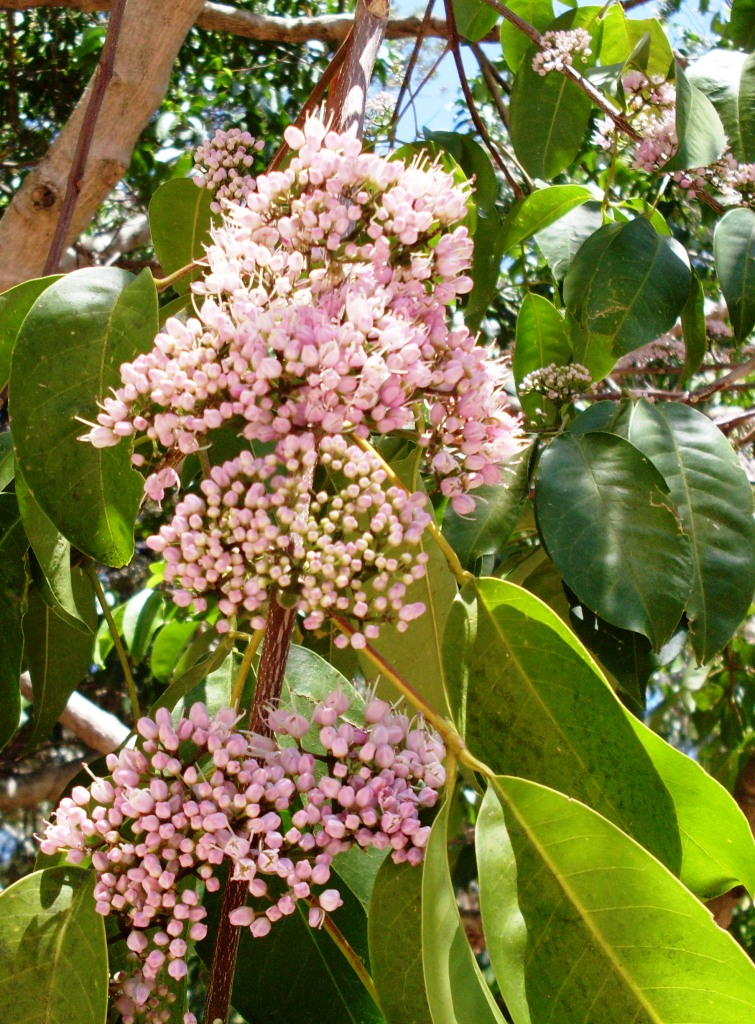
- In the Royal Botanic Garden, Sydney

Scientific classification
- Kingdom: Plantae
- Clade: Tracheophytes
- Clade: Angiosperms
- Clade: Eudicots
- Clade: Rosids
- Order: Sapindales
- Family: Rutaceae
- Genus: Melicope
- Species: M. elleryana

Binomial name
- Melicope elleryana F.Muell. T.G.Hartley

Synonyms
- List: Acronychia muelleri (Engl.) W.D.Francis nom. illeg.; Euodia elleryana F.Muell.; Euodia elleryana F.Muell. var. elleryana; Euodia elleryana var. pilosa (Lauterb.) W.D.Francis; Euodia muelleri Engl. nom. illeg.; Euodia tetragona var. pilosa Lauterb.; Evodia elleryana Domin orth. var.; Evodia elleryana var. pilosa W.D.Francis orth. var.; Evodia muelleri Engl. orth. var.; Evodia tetragona var. pilosa Lauterb. orth. var.; Evodiella muelleri (Engl.) B.L.Linden nom. illeg.; Evodiella muelleri (Engl.) B.L.Linden f. muelleri

= Melicope elleryana =

Pink-flowered doughwood

Species of shrub

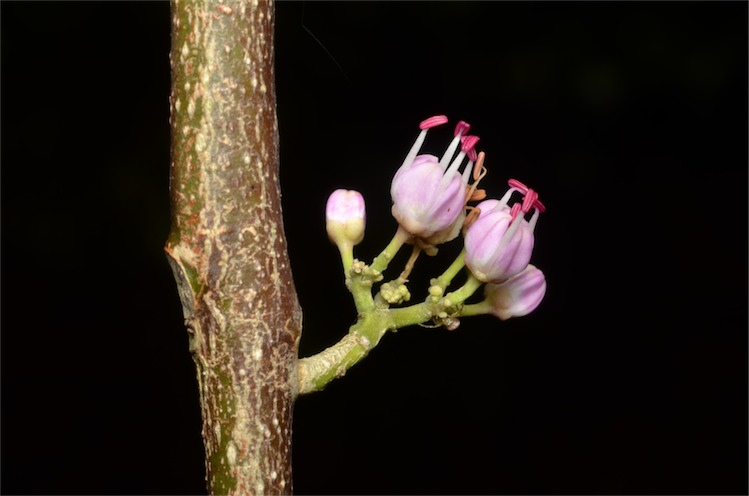
Flower detail

Melicope elleryana, commonly known as pink flowered doughwood, pink evodia, corkwood, or saruwa, is a species of rainforest shrub or tree in the family Rutaceae, and is native to New Guinea, parts of eastern Indonesia, the Solomon Islands and northern Australia. It has trifoliate leaves and pink to white, bisexual flowers arranged in panicles in leaf axils.

== Description ==
Melicope elleryana is a shrub or tree that typically grows to a height of 18–25 m (59–82 ft) with a trunk diameter of about 60 cm (24 in). The bark is pale brown and corky, especially at the base of the trunk. The leaves are arranged in opposite pairs and trifoliate on a petiole 20–110 mm (0.79–4.33 in) long. The leaflets are elliptical, sometimes egg-shaped, 55–200 mm (2.2–7.9 in) long and 35–80 mm (1.4–3.1 in) wide, the end leaflet on a petiolule 5–17 mm (0.20–0.67 in) long. The flowers are bisexual and arranged in panicles 25–60 mm (0.98–2.36 in) long. The sepals are round to egg-shaped, 1.3–2 mm (0.051–0.079 in) long and joined at the base. The petals are pink to white, 3.5–6.5 mm (0.14–0.26 in) long and there are four stamens. Flowering occurs from November to February and the fruit consists of up to four follicles 5–8 mm (0.20–0.31 in) long, containing shiny black seeds 2–3 mm (0.079–0.118 in) in diameter.

== Taxonomy ==
Pink-flowered doughwood was first formally described in 1865 by Ferdinand von Mueller who gave it the name Euodia elleryana and published the description in Fragmenta phytographiae Australiae from specimens collected by Anthelme Thozet near Beddome Creek (near Rockhampton). In 1990, Thomas Gordon Hartley changed the name to Melicope elleryana in the journal Telopea. The specific epithet (elleryana) honours the Victorian government astronomer, Robert L. J. Ellery.

== Habitat and distribution ==
Melicope elleryana grows in coastal and inland forest, woodland and rainforest from sea level to an altitude of 760 m (2,490 ft). It occurs from the Maluku Islands east to the Solomon Islands and south to New Guinea and northern Australia. In Australia it is found in the far north-east of Western Australia, the Top End of the Northern Territory, northern and eastern Queensland and south to the Clarence River in northern New South Wales.

== Ecology ==
This tree is the favoured food plant for the Ulysses butterfly, Papilio ulysses. Germination is unpredictable, starting within 30 days or possibly taking several years. Soaking the seeds for several days appears to remove some of the germination inhibitors.

== Uses ==
This species is often cultivated as an ornamental tree. In New Guinea it is said to be used to flavour palm wine and an exudate from the bark is used as an adhesive, for caulking canoes and as a wound treatment.
