= Tropane alkaloid =

Class of chemical compounds

Chemical structure of tropane which forms the core of tropane alkaloids

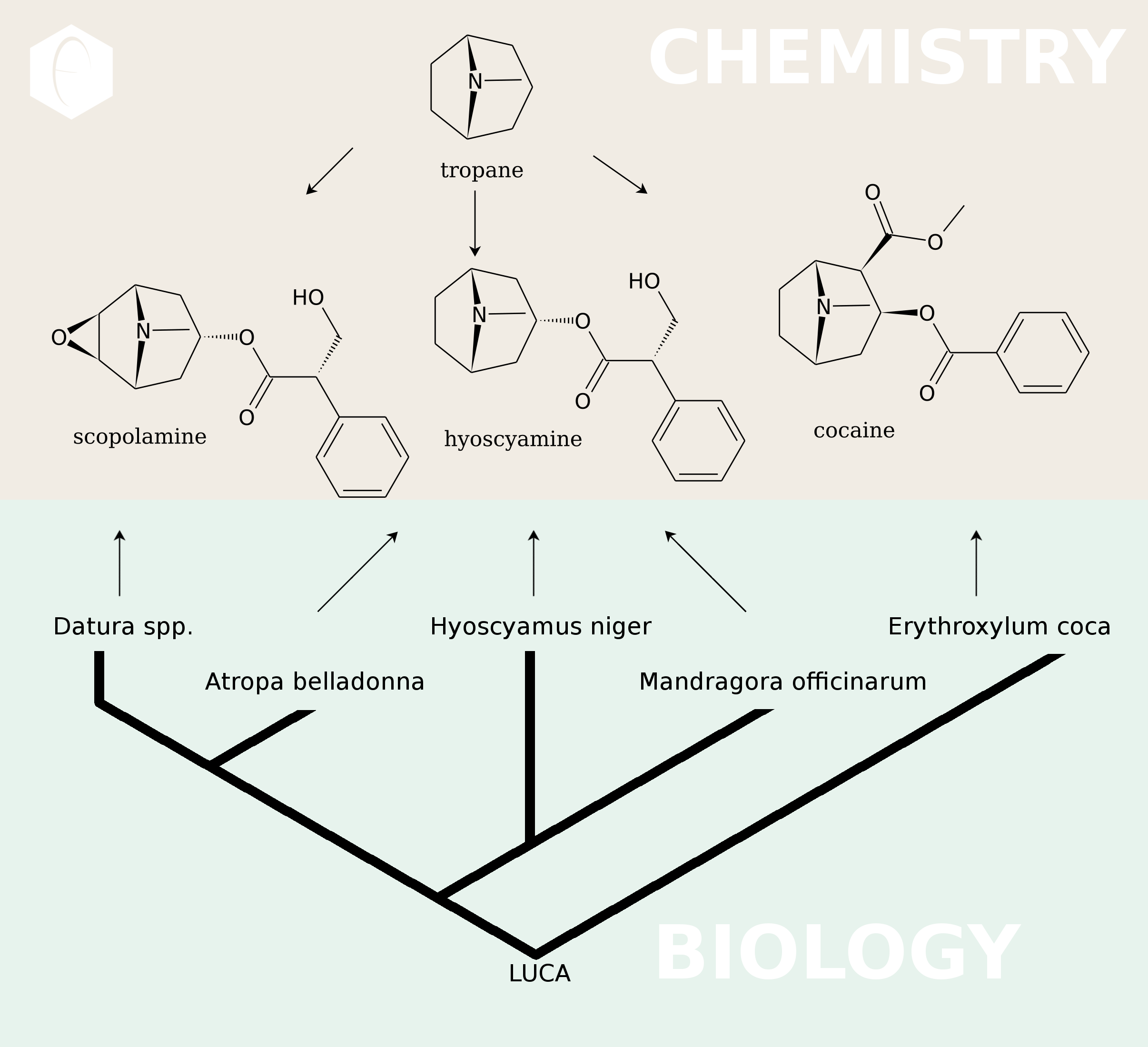
Chemical structure and phylogeny of tropane alkaloids. Displayed are 3 chemical compounds that occur as natural products in 5 plant species

Tropane alkaloids are a class of bicyclic [3.2.1] alkaloids and secondary metabolites that contain a tropane ring in their chemical structure. Tropane alkaloids occur naturally in many members of the plant family Solanaceae. Certain tropane alkaloids such as cocaine and scopolamine are notorious for their psychoactive effects, related usage and cultural associations. Tropane alkaloids tend to act as either anticholinergics (e.g atropine) or as stimulants and local anesthetics (e.g cocaine).

== Classification ==
=== Anticholinergics ===
Anticholinergic drugs and deliriants:

- Atropine, racemic hyoscyamine, from the deadly nightshade (Atropa belladonna)
- Hyoscyamine, the levo-isomer of atropine, from henbane (Hyoscyamus niger), mandrake (Mandragora officinarum) and the sorcerers' tree (Latua pubiflora).
- Scopolamine, from henbane and Datura species (Jimson weed)

All three chemicals can also be found in the leaves, stems, and flowers in varying, unknown amounts in Brugmansia (angel trumpets), a relative of Datura. The same is also true of many other plants belonging to subfamily Solanoideae of the Solanaceae, the alkaloids being concentrated particularly in the leaves and seeds. However, the concentration of alkaloids can vary greatly, even from leaf to leaf and seed to seed.

=== Stimulants ===
Stimulants (cocaine-related alkaloids):

- Cocaine, from coca plant (Erythroxylum coca)
- Ecgonine, a precursor and metabolite of cocaine
- Benzoylecgonine, a metabolite of cocaine
- Hydroxytropacocaine, from coca plant (Erythroxylum coca)
- Methylecgonine cinnamate, from coca plant (Erythroxylum coca)

=== Others ===
- Catuabines, found in catuaba, an infusion or dry extract made from Erythroxylum vaccinifolium
- Scopine
- Synthetic analogs of tropane alkaloids also exist, they are known as phenyltropanes.

== Biosynthesis ==
The biosynthesis of the tropane alkaloids have attracted intense interest because of their high physiological activity as well as the presence of the bicyclic tropane core.

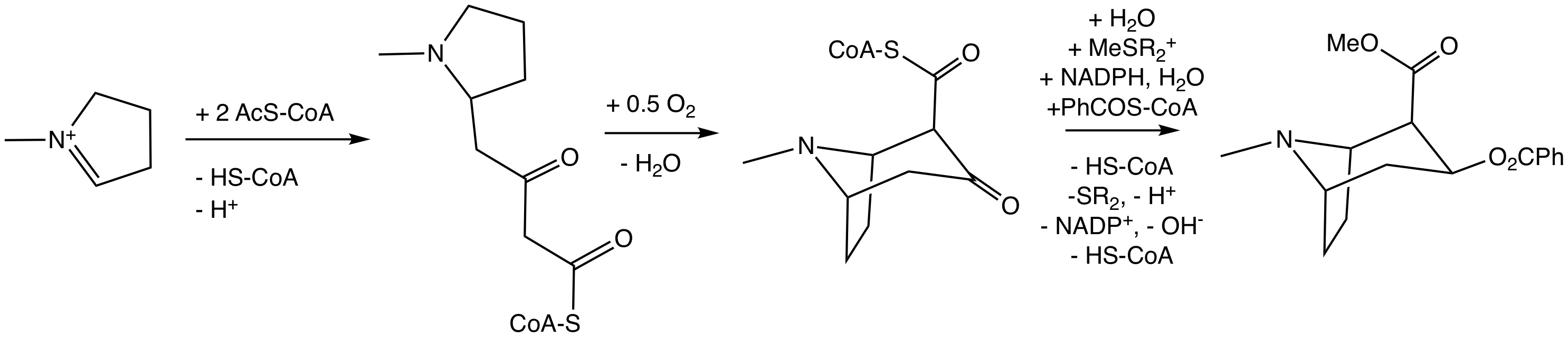
Final stages in the pathway for the biosynthesis of the tropane alkaloid cocaine.
