= Catuabine =

Group of chemical compounds

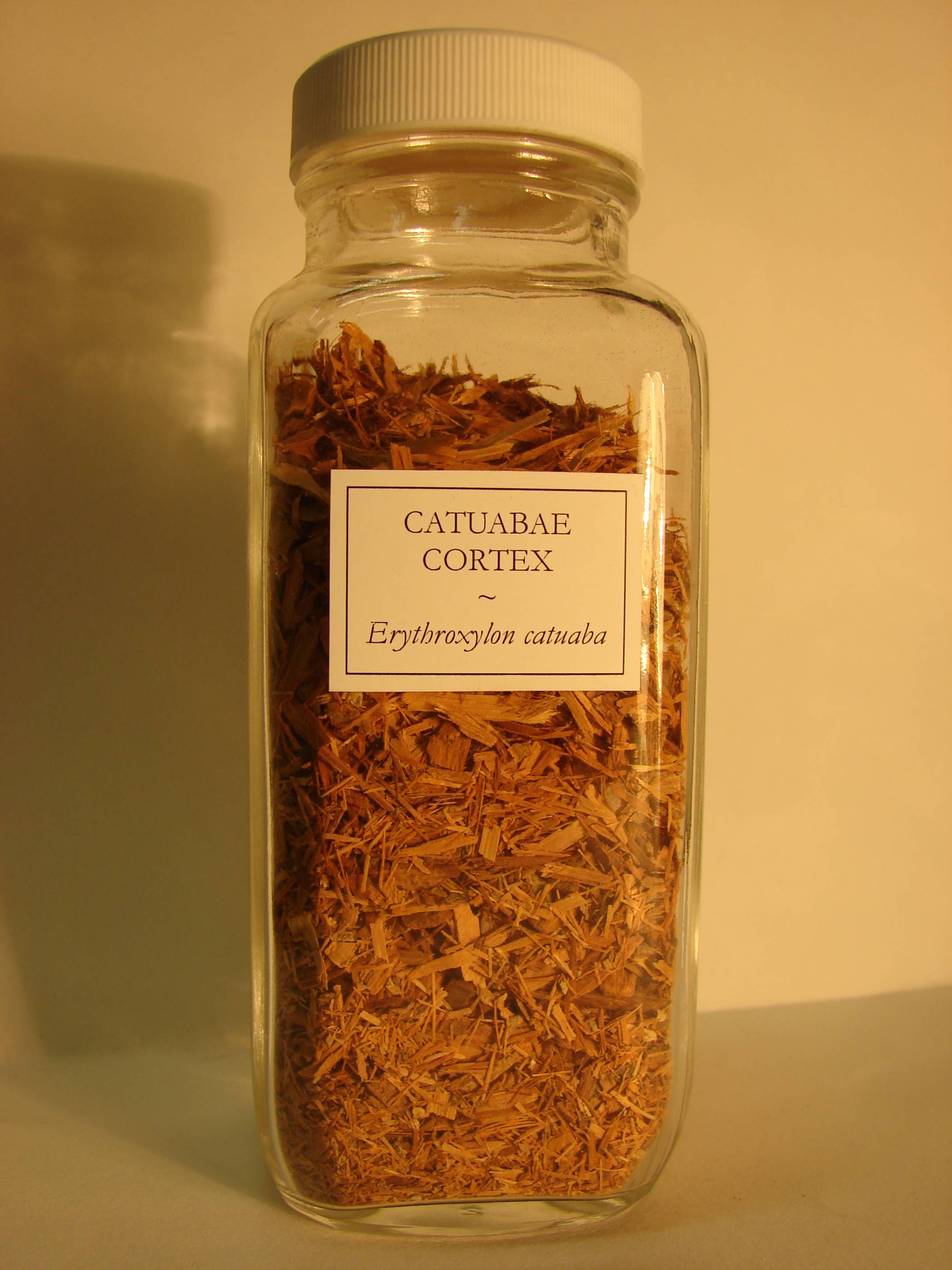
Bottle filled with "Catuaba" bark

Catuabines are a group of tropane alkaloids, isolated from Erythroxylum vaccinifolium, which are used in the preparation of the drug Catuaba (which in traditional Brazilian medicine is purported to be an aphrodisiac and central nervous system stimulant, though such claims have not been substantiated). While catuabine A, B and C were isolated and characterized by Graf and Lude (1977, 1978), catuabine D was recently isolated by Zanolari et al. The catuabines are not known to have any physiological effects, this is in contrast to cocaine, which is an active constituent of another species, Erythroxylum coca.

Catuabine A

Catuabine B

Catuabine C

Catuabine D

== See also ==
- Hygrine
- Cuscohygrine
