= Catuaba =

Tree bark infusion

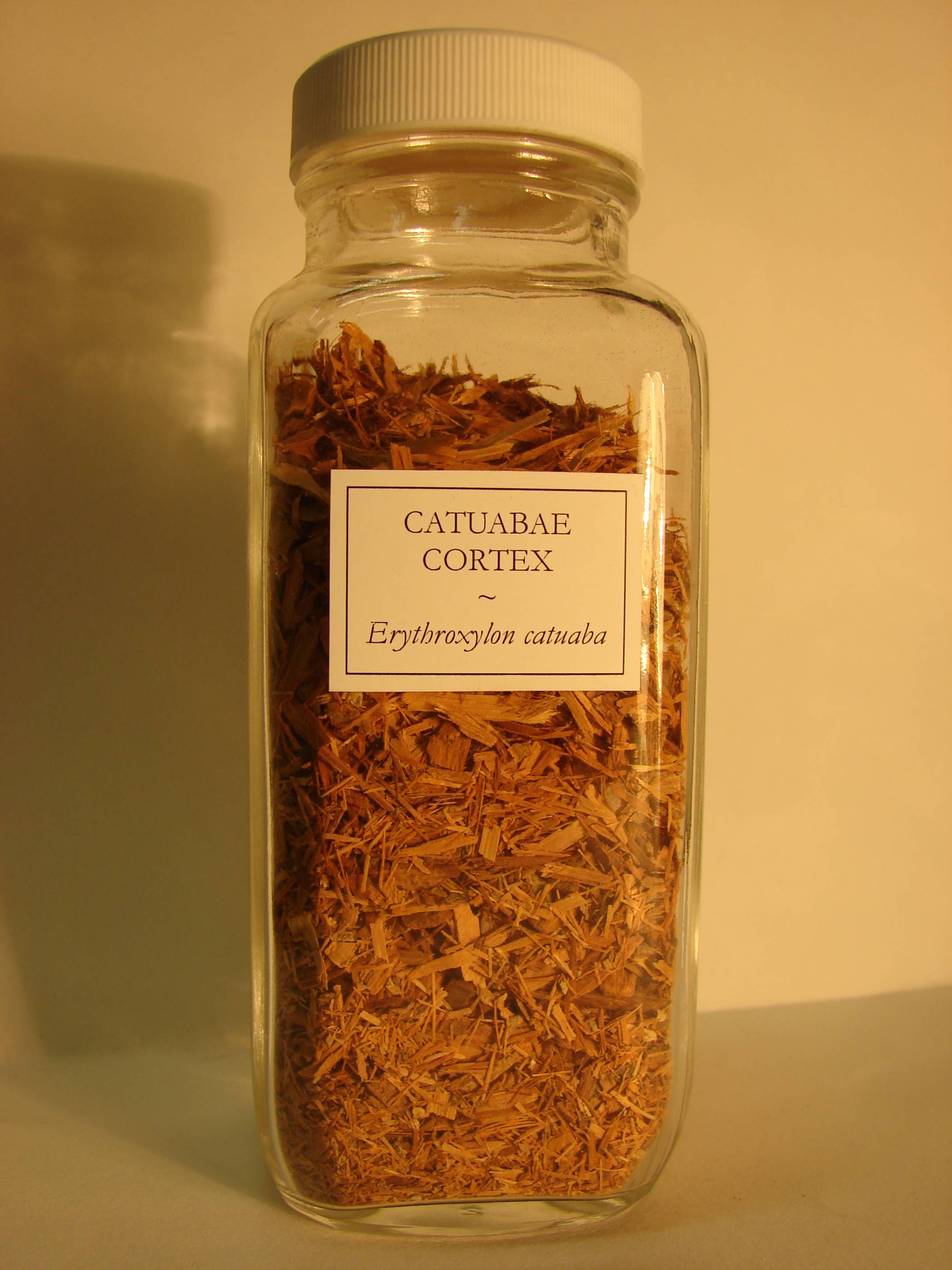
Bottle filled with "Catuaba" bark

The name Catuaba (/kəˈtwɑːbə/ kə-TWAH-bə, Brazilian Portuguese: [katuˈabɐ]; ultimately from Guarani) is used for the infusions of the bark of a number of trees native to Brazil. The most widely used barks are derived from the trees Trichilia catigua and Erythroxylum vaccinifolium. Other catuaba preparations use the bark of trees from the following genera or families: Anemopaegma, Ilex, Micropholis, Phyllanthus, Secondatia, Tetragastris and species from the Myrtaceae. Local synonyms are Chuchuhuasha, Tatuaba, Pau de Reposta, Piratancara and Caramuru.

It is often claimed that catuaba is derived from the tree Erythroxylum catuaba, but this tree has been described only once, in 1904, and it is not known today to what tree this name referred. E. catuaba is therefore not a recognised species.

== Uses ==
A commercial liquid preparation, Catuama, contains multiple ingredients, one of these being catuaba from Trichilia catigua (28.23%), in addition to Guarana (40.31%), Ptychopetalum olacoides (28.23%) and Ginger (3.26%).

An infusion of the bark is used in traditional Brazilian medicine as an aphrodisiac and central nervous system stimulant. These claims have not been confirmed in scientific studies. Catuaba (Trichilia catigua) was found to increase the release of Serotonin as well as Dopamine in rats. Catuaba (Erythroxylum vacciniifolium) contains the alkaloids catuabine A, B and C. A study by Manabe et al. (1992) showed that catuaba extracts from Catuaba casca (Erythroxylum catuaba Arr. Cam.) were useful in preventing potentially lethal bacterial infections and HIV infection in mice.
