= Papilio syfanius =

- Papilio syfanius in Leech Butterflies from China, Japan, and Corea (figure 5)

Scientific classification
- Kingdom: Animalia
- Phylum: Arthropoda
- Clade: Pancrustacea
- Class: Insecta
- Order: Lepidoptera
- Family: Papilionidae
- Genus: Papilio
- Species: P. syfanius

Binomial name
- Papilio syfanius Oberthür, 1886

Species of butterfly

Papilio syfanius is a species of swallowtail butterfly from the genus Papilio that is found in China, where it is endemic. It may be a western subspecies of Papilio bianor differentiated by the white hindwing patches (which vary in extent).

== Subspecies ==
- Papilio syfanius syfanius (northern Yunnan)
- Papilio syfanius albosyfanius Shimogori & Fujioka, 1997 (northern Yunnan)
- Papilio syfanius kongaensis (Yoshino, 1997) (Sichuan)

== Other reading ==
- Erich Bauer and Thomas Frankenbach, 1998 Schmetterlinge der Erde, Butterflies of the world Part I (1), Papilionidae Papilionidae I: Papilio, Subgenus Achillides, Bhutanitis, Teinopalpus. Edited by Erich Bauer and Thomas Frankenbach. Keltern : Goecke & Evers; Canterbury : Hillside Books ISBN 9783931374624
