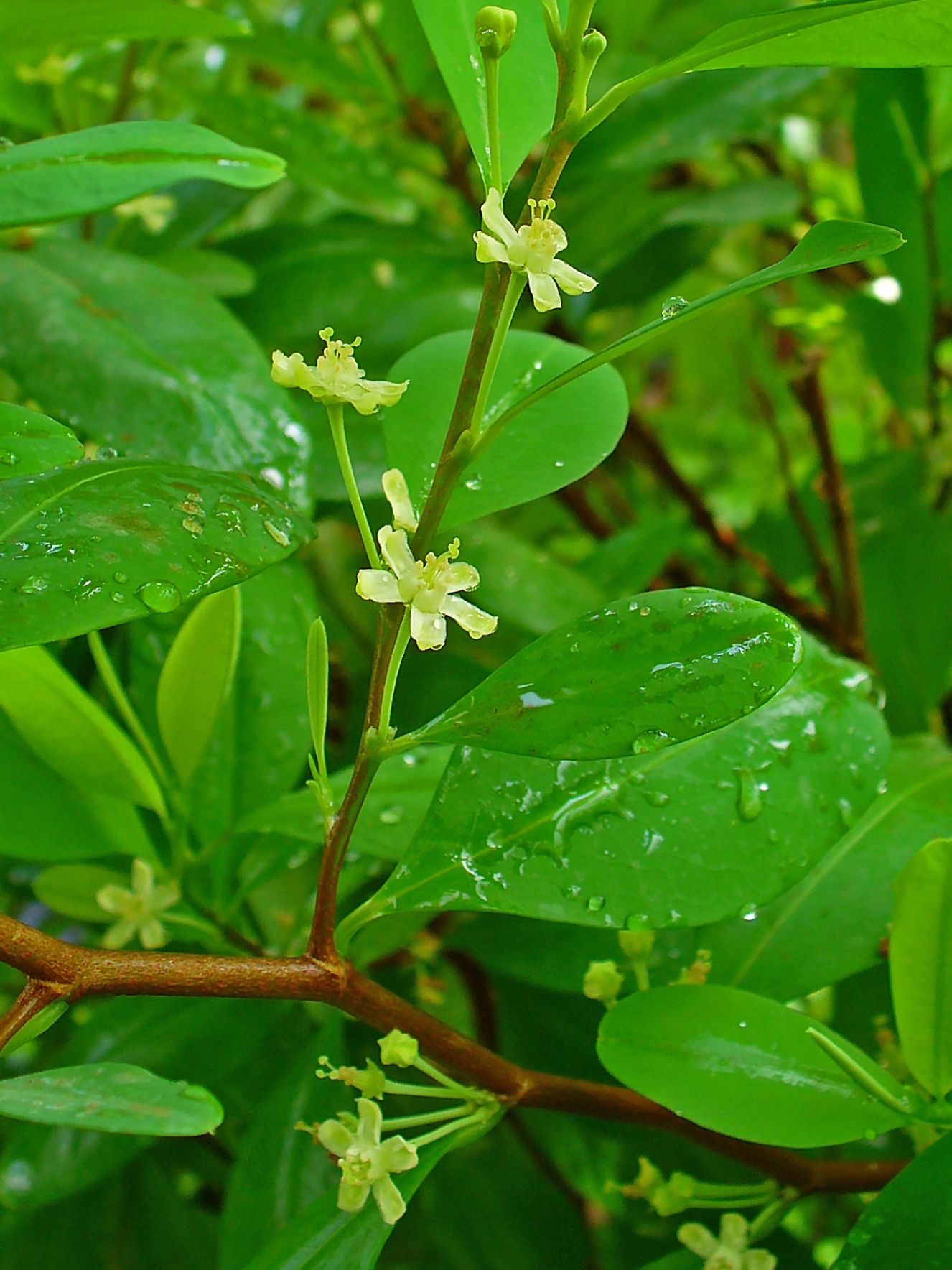
- Erythroxylum coca

Scientific classification
- Kingdom: Plantae
- Clade: Tracheophytes
- Clade: Angiosperms
- Clade: Eudicots
- Clade: Rosids
- Order: Malpighiales
- Family: Erythroxylaceae; Kunth

Genera
- Aneulophus; Erythroxylum; Nectaropetalum; Pinacopodium

= Erythroxylaceae =

Coca family

Family of flowering plants

Erythroxylaceae (the coca family) is a family of flowering trees and shrubs consisting of 4 genera and 271 species, native to Africa and South America. The four genera are Aneulophus Benth., Erythroxylum P.Browne, Nectaropetalum Engl., and Pinacopodium Exell & Mendonça. The best-known species are the coca plants, including the species Erythroxylum coca, the source of the substance coca.
