= Coca Colla =

Bolivian energy drink

Coca Colla is an energy drink produced in Bolivia with the use of coca extract as its base. It was launched on the Bolivian market in La Paz, Santa Cruz and Cochabamba in April 2010. Both the name and ingredients are similar to Coca-Cola. The release of this product is part of the process of the industrialization of coca followed by the Morales Administration from 2006 to 2019. The "Colla" component of the name comes from Qullasuyu, the southern area of the Inca Empire which included the western part of Bolivia. The term Qulla is nowadays used to name the Aymara and Quechua, indigenous people of Bolivia who make a traditional use of coca leaves.

== Description ==
The drink has a red label with white writing, is dark caramel in color, tastes sweet, and comes in 500 ml bottles priced at $1.50. The flavor of Coca Colla is derived from coca leaf extracts, a plant also known for its use as the base of cocaine powder. It is a restricted substance in many countries and illegal to sell, buy, or distribute in North America and Europe.

== Use and export ==
Evo Morales, Bolivia's first indigenous Aymara Indian president, announced last year he will make efforts to support the peoples of the Andes who have been using coca leaves for traditional use such as medication and rituals for thousands of years. 30,000 acres (120 km^{2}) of the Andes region is set aside for coca bush growth annually. This area is set to increase to 80,000 acres (320 km^{2}) with the increase of the government's drive for a legitimate use for the coca plant, such as toothpaste, pharmaceuticals, and coca tea.

The International Narcotics Control Board of the United Nations has had the coca leaf on the list of dangerous drugs since 1961. Exporting the drink worldwide will not be possible unless drug laws are changed, including local Bolivian law which prevents exporting any coca based product from the country. However, importers from Iran, Bolivia's economic and political ally, have already expressed an interest in over 2 million units of the drink when large scale production starts.

== Advertising ==
A joint collaboration between the Bolivian-based drink's manufacturer and the European-based advertising guerrilla group has been launched to increase the global mass media awareness of the new Coca Colla drink. The launch has sparked worldwide interest in the questionable nature of the product's globally illegal ingredients, even though the use of coca leaf is acceptable by the indigenous cultures which have traditionally cultivated it. In a press release, the manufacturer OSPICoca's President Victor Ledezma stated "Coca is ours, coca is a Bolivian product and mostly occurs in the Qullasuyu."

== See also ==
- Legal status of cocaine
- National Coca Company
- Stepan Company
