= National Coca Company =

Peruvian state company

The National Company of the Coca (Spanish: Empresa Nacional de la Coca, ENACO) is a Peruvian state company dedicated to the commercialization of the coca leaf and derivatives. It is the only state company that has a monopoly on the commercialization and derivatives of the coca leaf. It was created in 1949. In 1982, it became a state company under private law.

It has a list of 31,000 legal producers of coca leaf in Peru, who export between 130,000 and 150,000 kilos of coca leaves annually directly to the Stepan Company. The Stepan Company extracts the cocaine for medicinal use. In 2002, a company called Kokka Royal Food & Drink began selling KDrink, which is a coca leaf-infused energy drink, similar to Coca Colla in Bolivia.

Nonetheless, much of this cocaine enters the black market. In 2023, one estimate was 90%. The operation of the company is specified in Law 22095.

== See also ==
- Legal status of cocaine
