= Coca flour =

Flour made from coca plant leaves

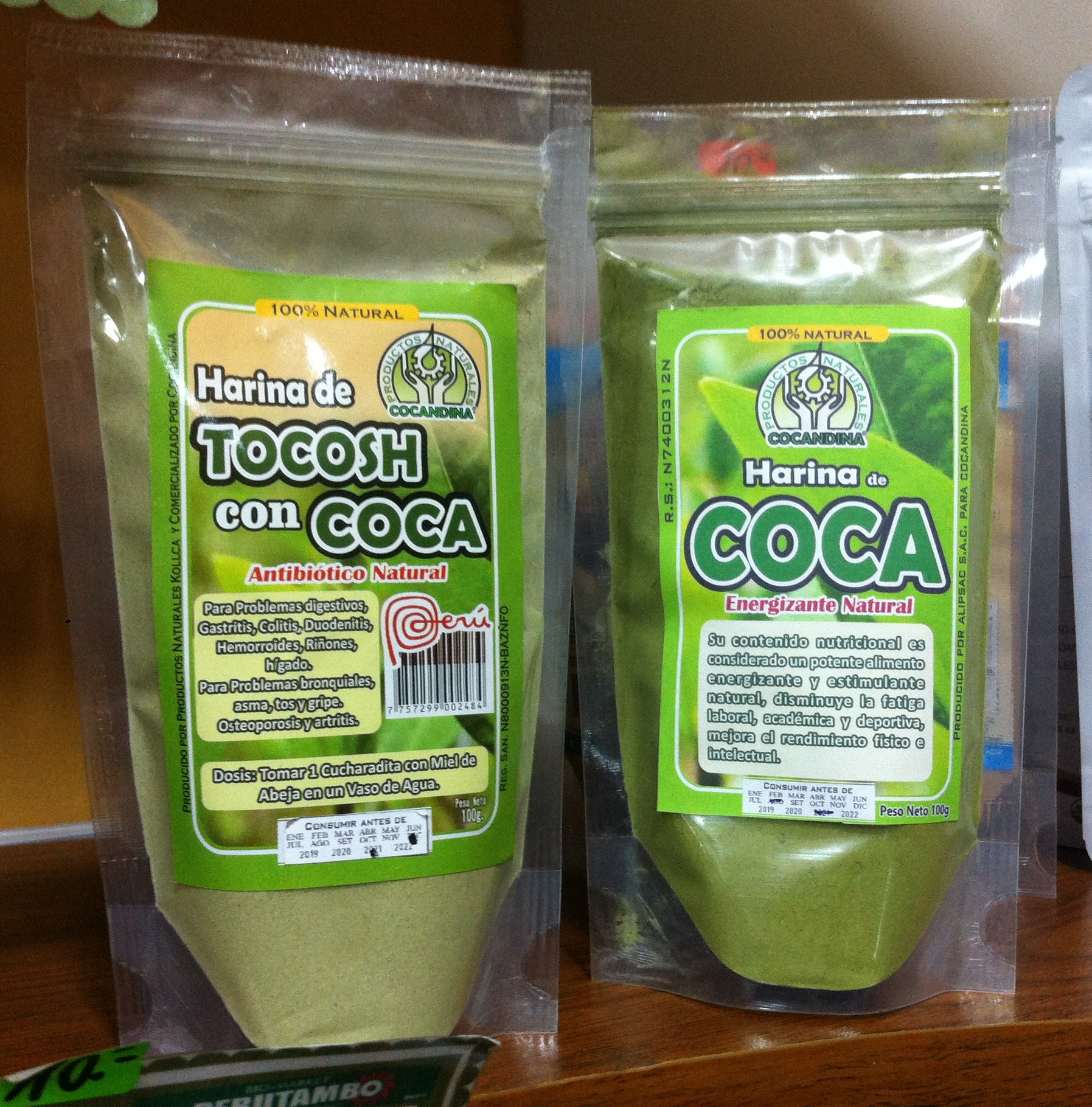
Coca flour, pure and mixed with tocosh flour, made in Peru.

Coca flour is made from whole ground dried coca leaves harvested from the coca plant, Erythroxylum coca or Erythroxylum novogranatense. Coca flour is commercially produced and sold in stores in Argentina, Bolivia, Colombia and Peru.

Coca flour is primarily used regionally as a nutritional additive in breads, cakes, candy, juices and cereals. In the Andes it is widely accepted as a natural medicine, and used as a remedy for gastritis, colic, rheumatism, arthritis, dry cough, cholesterol and diabetes.

Coca flour is also used as a capsulized food supplement as it contains all natural properties of the whole coca leaf including the essential minerals (calcium, potassium, phosphorus), vitamins (B1, B2, C, and E) and nutrients such as protein and fiber.

== See also ==
- Cocaine
- Ypadu
