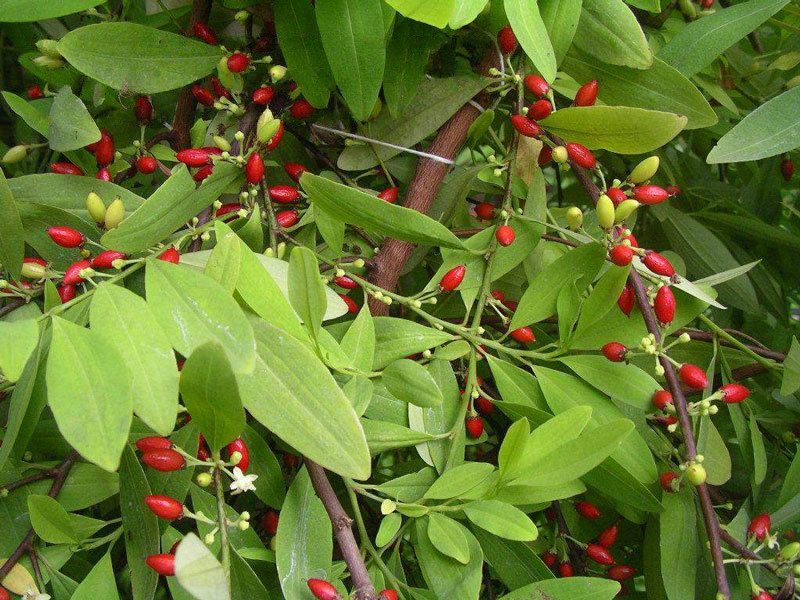
- Flowering and fruiting E. novogranatense var. novogranatense

Scientific classification
- Kingdom: Plantae
- Clade: Embryophytes
- Clade: Tracheophytes
- Clade: Spermatophytes
- Clade: Angiosperms
- Clade: Eudicots
- Clade: Rosids
- Order: Malpighiales
- Family: Erythroxylaceae
- Genus: Erythroxylum
- Species: E. novogranatense

Binomial name
- Erythroxylum novogranatense (D. Morris) Hieron.

Varieties
- See here

Synonyms
- Erythroxylum coca var. novogranatense D.Morris

= Erythroxylum novogranatense =

Species of flowering plant

Erythroxylum novogranatense, also known as Colombian Coca, is a species of shrub or small tree in the family Erythroxylaceae native to Colombia, Ecuador, Peru, Trinidad-Tobago, and Venezuela. It is used medicinally and as a narcotic. Erythroxylum novogranatense is one of the primary species of cultivated Coca, despite being less widely cultivated than Erythroxylum coca.

== Description ==
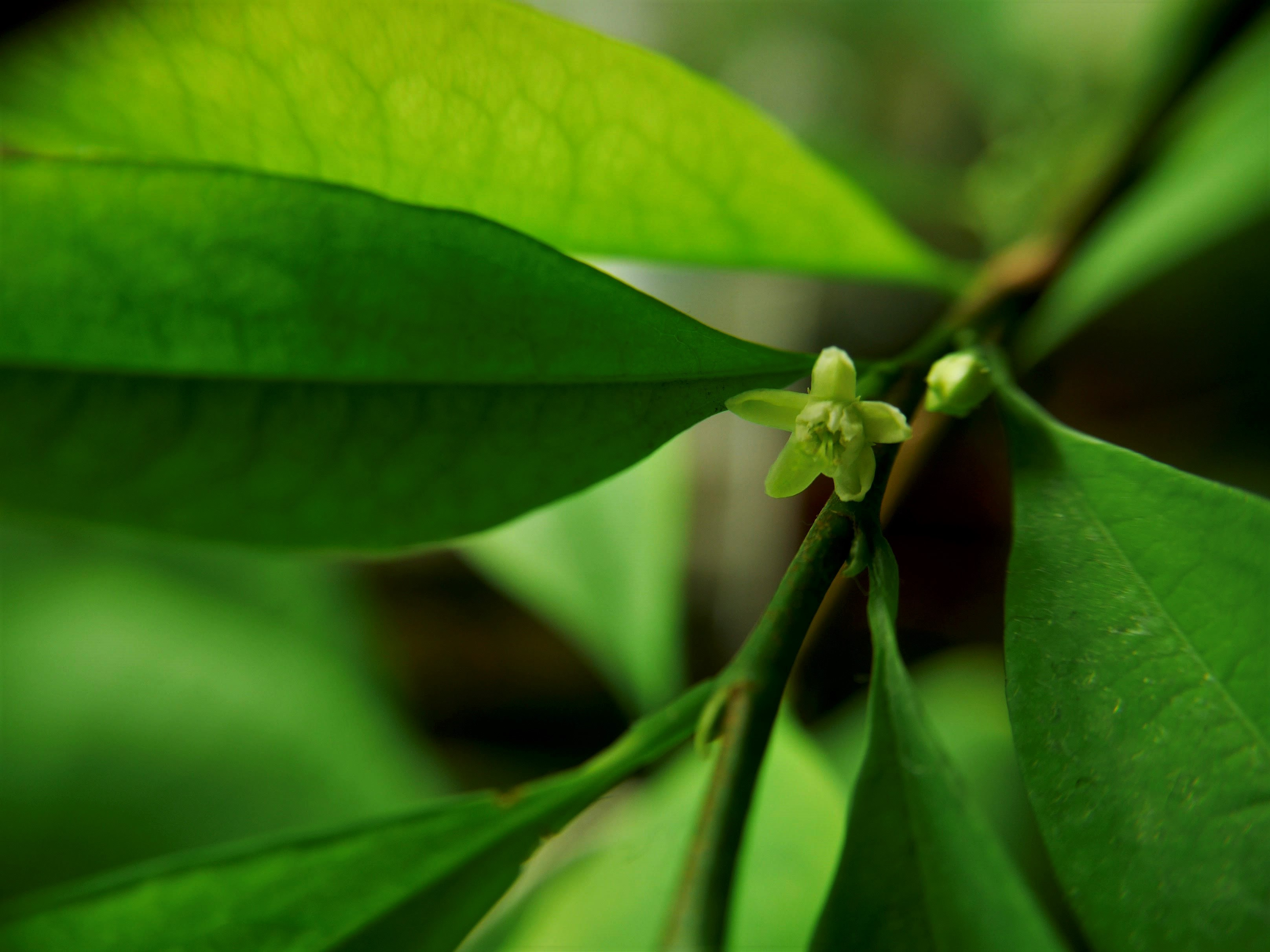
Erythroxylum novogranatense var. truxillense flower

=== Vegetative characteristics ===
Erythroxylum novogranatense is an up to 3 m tall shrub or small tree. The bright green, oblong-elliptic or obovate, petiolate, simple, alternate leaves with a 0.5 cm long petiole are 1.2–4.7 cm long, and 1–1.8 cm wide.

=== Generative characteristics ===
The continuously produced, small, solitary or grouped, pedicellate, hermaphrodite flowers have five oblong, yellowish white, 0,4 cm long, and 0,2 cm wide petals. The five 1.5 mm long sepals are basally fused. The flowers are distylous and partly self-compatible, but only the pin (i.e. long-styled) flowers are partially self-compatible and the thrum (i.e. short-styled) flowers are self-incompatible.

=== Cytology ===
The chromosome count of Erythroxylum novogranatense is 2n = 24.

== Taxonomy ==
It was first described as Erythroxylum coca var. novogranatense D.Morris by Daniel Morris in 1889. It was elevated to the status of a separate species as Erythroxylum novogranatense (D.Morris) Hieron. by Georg Hans Emmo Wolfgang Hieronymus in 1895. It is placed in the section Erythroxylum sect. Archerythroxylum. It is closely related to Erythroxylum cataractarum, Erythroxylum gracilipes, and Erythroxylum coca.

=== Varieties ===
It has three accepted varieties:

- Erythroxylum novogranatense var. novogranatense
- Erythroxylum novogranatense var. tobagense O.E.Schulz
- Erythroxylum novogranatense var. truxillense (Rusby) Plowman

=== Etymology ===
The specific epithet novogranatense, from the Latin novus meaning new and granatensis meaning of Granada, refers to the geographic origin of the plant in Colombia, which was formerly known as Nueva Granada.

== Distribution and habitat ==
Erythroxylum novogranatense is native to Colombia, Ecuador, Peru, Trinidad-Tobago, and Venezuela. It is only known from cultivation and Erythroxylum novogranatense would not persist in the wild without human intervention. It tolerates non-acidic soils. It has been Introduced to South-Central and Southeastern China, Hainan, Java, Leeward Islands, Sulawesi, Taiwan, Vietnam, and the Windward Islands.

== Ecology ==
Erythroxylum novogranatense is a highland variety that is utilized in lowland areas. It is cultivated in drier regions in South America, where it requires irrigation.

== Toxicity ==
The cocaine content in leaves of E. novogranatense var. novogranatense is 0.55-0.93%, with an average of 0.77% and in E. novogranatense var. truxillense the cocaine content is 0.42-1.02%, with a mean of 0.72%. The foliage also contains cinnamoylcocaine. The plants also contain methyl salicylate.

== Use ==
As one of the oldest cultivated plants in the Americas, Erythroxylum novogranatense has been cultivated as a source of cocaine for thousands of years, but its role in the production of cocaine is relatively small. Erythroxylum novogranatense var. novogranatense represents about 20% of the coca crop grown in Colombia. Erythroxylum novogranatense var. truxillense is used as a flavouring agent of Coca-Cola, which uses decocainised extracts of this variety. The cocaine produced by the process of decocanisation is sold for legal use in modern surgery for pain management. Dried leaves of Erythroxylum novogranatense var. novogranatense are used in the preparation of coca tea by the indigenous Nasa tribe of Colombia. The leaves of Erythroxylum novogranatense are also used to produce Coca flour. It is cultivated as an ornamental plant throughout tropical countries.

== Legality ==
It is illegal in Colombia. It has been subject to extensive eradication.
