= Coca tea =

Infusion of coca plant leaves

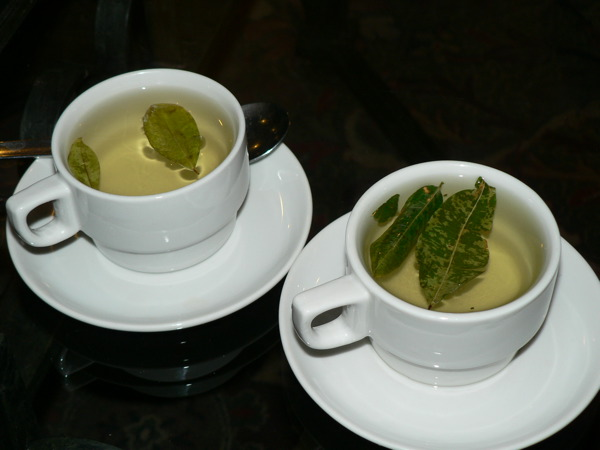
Two cups of coca tea

Coca tea, also called mate de coca, is a herbal tea (infusion) made using the raw or dried leaves of the cocaine-containing coca plant, which is native to South America. It is made either by submerging the coca leaf or steeping a tea bag in hot water. The tea is most commonly consumed in the Andes mountain range, particularly Argentina, Bolivia, Colombia, Ecuador and especially in Peru, where it is consumed all around the country. It is greenish yellow in color and has a mild bitter flavor similar to green tea with a more organic sweetness.

There is no evidence that the use of coca tea leads to dependence or addiction, potentially due to the low concentrations of cocaine present.

Though also known as mate, mate de coca is made from a different plant than the yerba mate drink in southeastern South America.

== Alkaloid content and stimulant properties ==
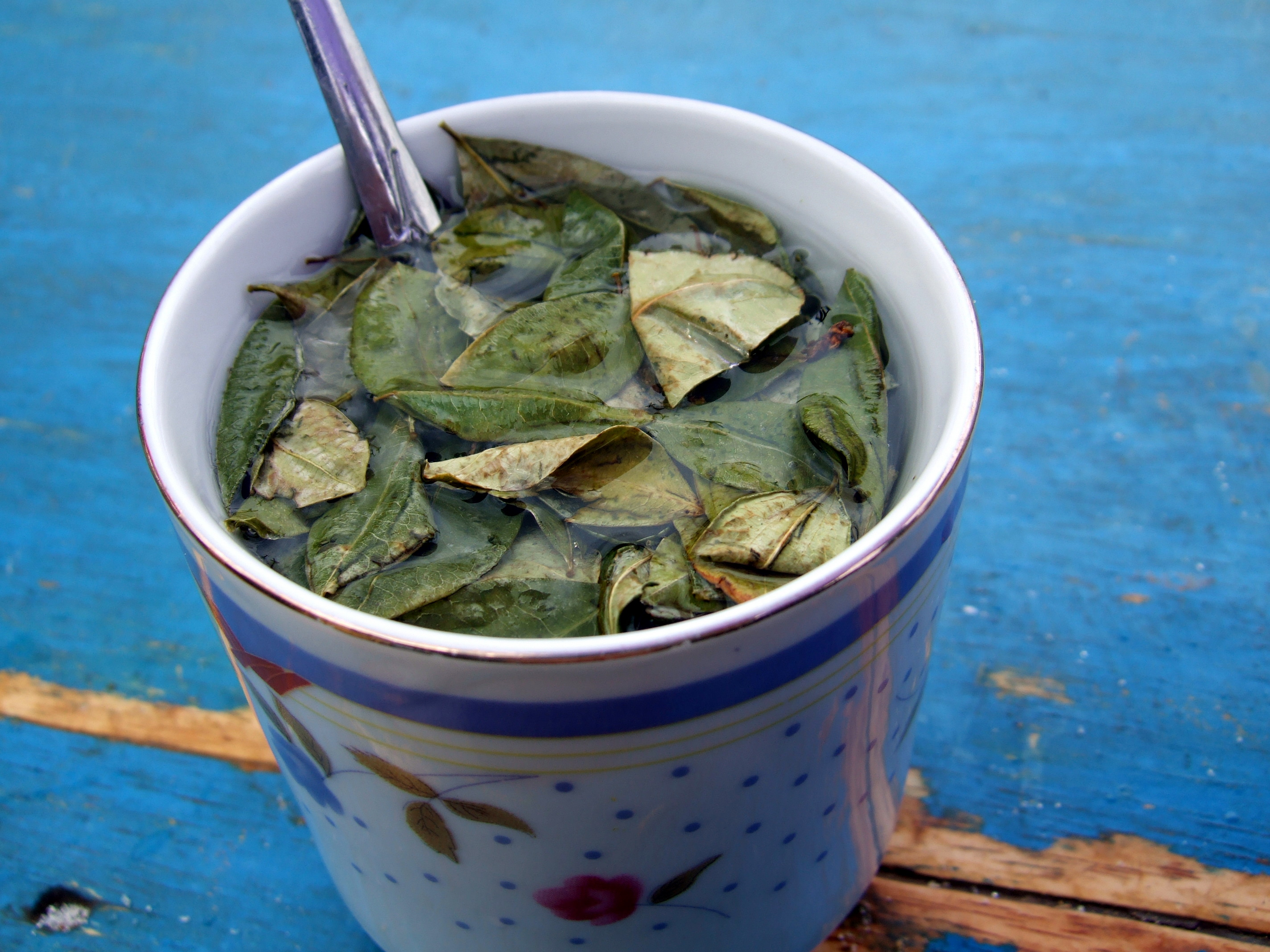
A cup served in Villazón, Bolivia

The leaves of the coca plant contain alkaloids that—when extracted chemically—are the source for cocaine base. The amount of coca alkaloid in the raw leaves is small, however. A cup of coca tea prepared from one gram of coca leaves (the typical contents of a tea bag) contains approximately 4.2 mg of organic coca alkaloid. (In comparison, a typical dose (a "line") of cocaine contains between 20 and 30 milligrams.) Owing to the presence of these alkaloids, coca tea is a mild stimulant; its consumption may be compared to consumption of a moderately strong cup of coffee or tea. The coca alkaloid content of coca tea is such that the consumption of one cup of coca tea can cause a positive result on a drug test for cocaine, however.

Similar to decaffeination in coffee, coca tea can be decocainized. Just as decaffeinated coffee retains a small quantity of caffeine, decocainized coca tea will still contain a small quantity of organic coca alkaloids.

There is little information on the pharmacological and toxicological effects of consuming coca tea. A chemical analysis by solid-phase extraction and gas chromatography–mass spectrometry (SPE-GC/MS) of Peruvian and Bolivian tea bags indicated the presence of significant amounts of cocaine, the metabolite benzoylecgonine, ecgonine methyl ester and trans-cinnamoylcocaine in coca tea bags and coca tea. Urine specimens were also analyzed from an individual who consumed one cup of coca tea and it was determined that enough cocaine and cocaine-related metabolites were present to produce a positive drug test.

== Legal status ==
Coca tea is legal in Colombia, Peru, Bolivia, Argentina, Uruguay and Ecuador. Its use is being discouraged in part by the Single Convention on Narcotic Drugs. Coca tea is illegal in the United States unless it is decocainized.

== Traditional medicine ==
Andean indigenous peoples use the tea in traditional medicine practices.

Visitors to the city of Cuzco in Peru, and La Paz in Bolivia are greeted with the offering of coca leaf infusions (prepared in teapots with whole coca leaves) purportedly to help the newly arrived traveler overcome the malaise of high altitude sickness. Coca tea may be recommended for travelers in the Andes to prevent altitude sickness, although its actual effectiveness has never been systematically studied.

== See also ==
- Vin Mariani, a French-Corsican coca wine
- Pemberton's French Wine Coca, a coca wine, the inspiration for Coca-Cola
- Coca-Cola, an international soft drink made with decocainized coca leaf
- Coca Colla, a similar Bolivian drink
- Cocoroco, a very strong Bolivian alcoholic beverage
- Coca flour
