= Stepan Company =

American company

- Type: Public
- Traded as: NYSE: SCL; S&P 600 Component
- Industry: Chemicals
- Founded: 1932
- Founders: Alfred C. Stepan, Jr.
- Headquarters: Northbrook, Illinois
- Revenue: ▲US$1.925 billion (2017)
- Operating income: ▲US$146.2 million (2017)
- Net income: ▲US$91.6 million (2017)
- Total assets: ▲US$1.471 billion (2017)
- Total equity: ▲US$741.1 million (2017)
- Number of employees: 2,096 (2017)
- Website: www.stepan.com

Stepan Company is an American manufacturer of specialty chemicals headquartered in Northbrook, Illinois. The company was founded in 1932 by Alfred C. Stepan, Jr., and has approximately 2,000 employees. It is currently run by his grandson, F. Quinn Stepan, Jr. The company describes itself as the largest global merchant manufacturer of anionic surfactants, which are used to enhance the foaming and cleaning capabilities of detergents, shampoos, toothpastes, and cosmetics.

== History ==
In its earliest days, Stepan Company was just Alfred C. Stepan Jr., who began distributing chemical products to control road dust on country roads in Illinois. His first location was a rented desk at Chicago’s North Pier Terminal.

== Products ==
Stepan produces a wide array of industrial chemicals used as raw materials to make end products in the following industries: agriculture, antimicrobial, beverages, construction, dietary supplements, emulsion polymerization, flavors, food, household, institutional, and industrial cleaning, industrial products, laundry and cleaning, nutrition, nutritional powders, oilfield, personal care, pharmaceutical, phthalic anhydride, and polyester polyols (for coatings, adhesives, sealants, elastomers, powder coating resins, and rigid foam).

== Coca extraction ==
Coca-Cola includes a coca leaf extract as an ingredient prepared by a Stepan Company plant in Maywood, New Jersey. The facility, which had been known as the Maywood Chemical Works, was purchased by Stepan in 1959. The plant is the only commercial entity in the United States authorized by the Drug Enforcement Administration to import coca leaves, which come primarily from Peru via the National Coca Company. Approximately 100 metric tons of dried coca leaf are imported each year. The cocaine-free extract is sold to The Coca-Cola Company for use in soft drinks, while the cocaine is sold to Mallinckrodt, a pharmaceutical firm, for medicinal purposes.

== See also ==
- Legal status of cocaine
