= Ypadu =

Powder made from toasted coca leaves and the ash of various other plants

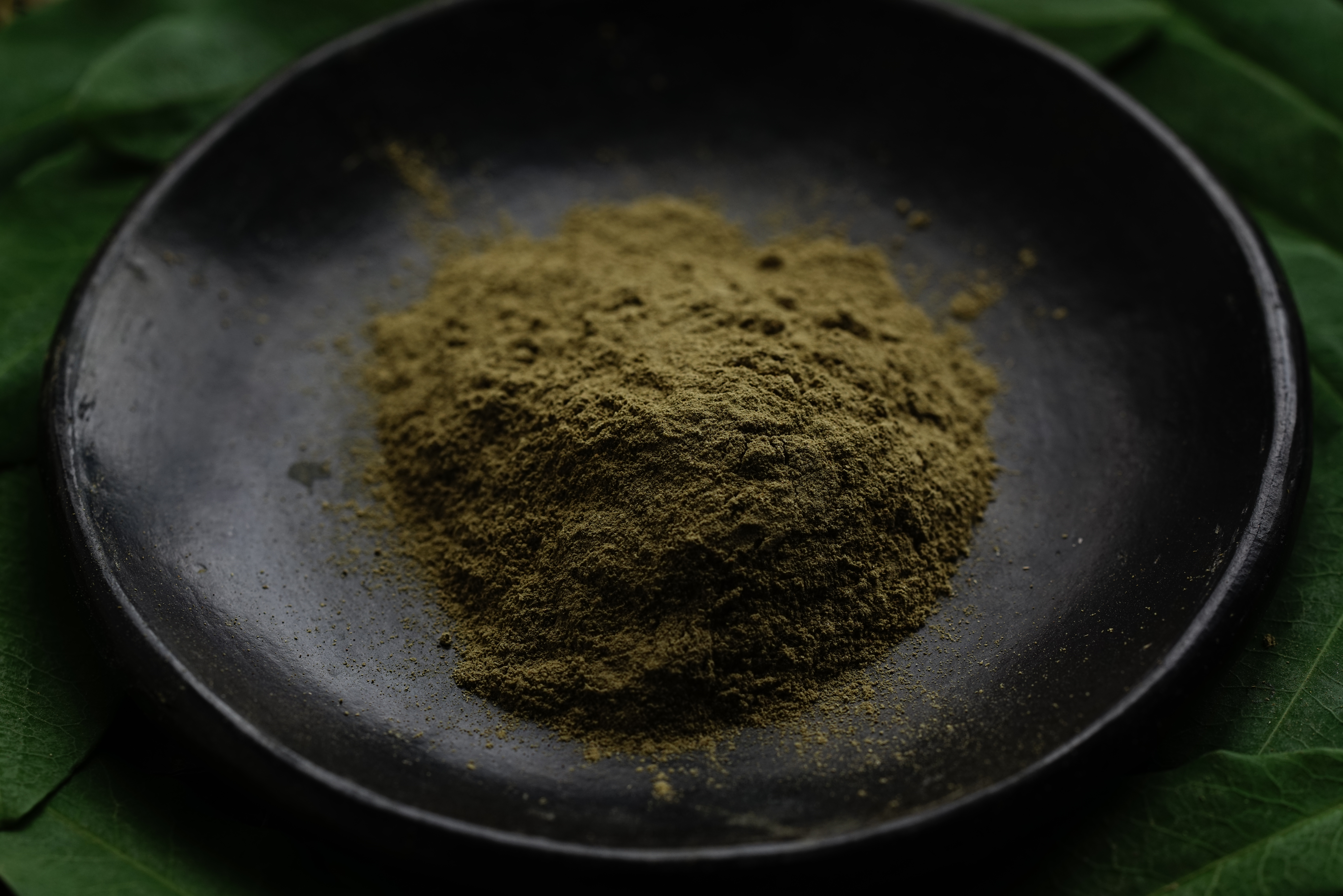
Mambe or ypadu is made from toasted and ground coca leaves with ashes

Ypadú or ypadu (also known as mambé) is an unrefined, unconcentrated powder made from toasted coca leaves and the ash of various other plants. It is traditionally prepared and consumed by indigenous tribes in the Northwest Amazon. Like coca teas consumed in Peru to adapt to sickness induced by high elevation, it has a long ethnobotanical history and cultural associations.

== Background ==
A report by Pien Metaal and others written for the Transnational Institute ("Coca yes, cocaine no?", p. 19) states that:

"Ypadú would not be more than an element in Amazonian botanical and ethnographic folklore were it not for its use, which enshrines it as a precursor in the current trend in favour of the 'industrialisation' of coca. Because ypadú leaves are very fibrous and their alkaloid content is low, lowland cultures have developed a process for transformation of the leaf that produces a very fine powder [...]. The traditional technique consists of toasting the leaves in an earthenware pot, crushing them in a wooden mortar, mixing them with ash from the leaf of the yarumo plant (Cecropia spp.), and passing them through a sieve to eliminate the fibrous part. The resulting powder is easily handled and rapidly absorbed. Experiments done by Anthony Henman in Lima and São Paulo have shown that a modern ypadú, made with any variety of coca leaf and with ash made from quinoa straw, is well accepted by people who find the laborious process of chewing whole leaves to be tedious.

Ypadú could become the much-desired bridge between the traditional use of coca and new industrialised products demanded by the 21st-century world. Although it probably would not replace the traditional chewing of coca leaves, or chacchado, in the Andean countries, it could become and alternative to refined cocaine, which – despite all efforts to suppress it – has become a mass-consumption commodity in large areas of the world. As a result, it could become an effective tool for public policies that seek 'harm reduction' and a way to absorb the properties of coca.

In short, ypadú would help achieve what no government has managed to do: re-educate the demand for cocaine and, along the way, return coca to its deserved pre-eminence as an ancestral plant of wisdom." ("Coca yes, cocaine no?", p. 19)

== Contemporary development of an ancient tradition ==
Foreign visitors to some Latin American countries have demonstrated an interest in commercial and cultural uses of the stimulant properties of the coca plant, which are less harmful than cocaine which is highly and unnaturally refined. A few websites depict a mild modern preparation of the powdery ypadu mixture using plastic jars and coffee grinders or food processors rather than the traditional implements such as clay vessels and mortar-and-pestles fashioned from wood. Peruvian coca of the species Erythroxylum coca has reportedly been used in this adaptation to produce effective mixtures with pleasant taste.

== Support for the use of Ypadu ==
Proponents of coca recommend mass production of ypadu as a harmless replacement for heavily refined and concentrated cocaine. They argue that a mild alternative to cocaine would cut into the illicit drug trade and the costs it imposes on societies.
