= Coca =

Plant in the Erythroxylaceae family

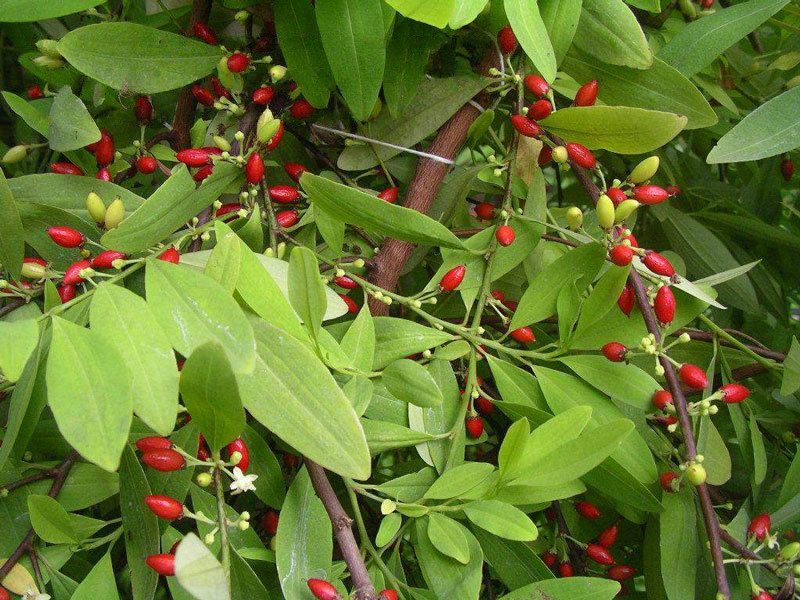
- Erythroxylum novogranatense var. novogranatense leaves and berries
- Source plant(s): Erythroxylum coca var. coca, Erythroxylum coca var. ipadu; Erythroxylum novogranatense var. novogranatense, Erythroxylum novogranatense var. truxillense
- Part(s) of plant: Leaves, fruits
- Geographic origin: Andes
- Active ingredients: Cocaine, benzoylecgonine, ecgonine, others
- Legal status: AU: S9 (Prohibited substance); BR: Class E (Controlled plants); CA: Schedule I; DE: Anlage III (Special prescription form required); NZ: Class A; UK: Class A; US: Schedule II; UN: Narcotic Schedule I; Controlled unless decocainized, in general legal for religious, medical or traditional use, legal in South America except in Brazil and Paraguay.

Coca is any of the four cultivated plants in the family Erythroxylaceae, native to western South America. It is known worldwide for its psychoactive alkaloid, cocaine. The leaves contain cocaine, which acts as a mild stimulant when chewed or consumed as tea; this traditional use involves slower absorption than purified cocaine, and there is no evidence of addiction or withdrawal symptoms from such natural consumption.

The coca plant is a shrub-like bush with curved branches, oval leaves marked by distinct curved lines, and small yellowish-white flowers that develop into red berries. Genomic analysis indicates coca was domesticated two or three separate times from the wild species Erythroxylum gracilipes by different South American groups during the Holocene. Chewing coca leaves dates back at least 8,000 years in South America, as evidenced by coca leaves and calcite found in house floors in Peru's Nanchoc Valley, suggesting early communal use alongside the rise of farming. Coca use was widespread under Inca rule. The Incas deeply integrated it into their society for labor, religion, and trade, valuing it so highly that they colonized new lands for its cultivation. Spanish colonizers later attempted to suppress its use, but ultimately relied on it to sustain enslaved laborers. Traditionally, across Andean cultures, coca leaves have been used for medicinal, nutritional, religious, and social purposes—serving as a stimulant, remedy for ailments, spiritual tool, and source of sustenance, primarily through chewing and tea.

Coca thrives in hot, humid environments and can be harvested multiple times a year from carefully tended plots. It is grown as a cash crop in the Argentine Northwest, Bolivia, the Alto Rio Negro Indigenous Territory in Brazil, Colombia, Venezuela, Ecuador, and Peru, including in areas where its cultivation is unlawful. There are some reports of cultivation in southern Mexico using seeds imported from South America, as an alternative to smuggling the processed drug cocaine. The plant plays a fundamental role in many traditional Amazonian and Andean cultures, as well as among indigenous groups in the Sierra Nevada de Santa Marta of northern Colombia.

Coca leaves are used commercially and industrially in teas, foods, cosmetics, and beverages. Their legal commercial use has growing political and market support in countries like Bolivia and Peru, despite restrictions in others like Colombia. The international prohibition of the coca leaf, established by the 1961 United Nations Single Convention—which did not distinguish it from cocaine despite traditional Andean uses—has been widely contested. Bolivia and Peru have led ongoing efforts to reevaluate its status, including a scheduled 2025 WHO review based on cultural and scientific grounds. Outside South America, coca leaf is generally illegal or heavily restricted, often treated similarly to cocaine. Limited exceptions exist for scientific or medical use, and for specific authorized imports such as the decocainized leaf extract used for Coca-Cola flavoring in the United States.

The cocaine alkaloid content in dry Erythroxylum coca var. coca leaves ranges from 0.23% to 0.96%. Coca-Cola used coca leaf extract in its products from 1885 until about 1903, when it switched to using a decocainized leaf extract. Extracting cocaine from coca requires several solvents and a chemical process known as an acid–base extraction, which can efficiently isolate the alkaloids from the plant material.

== Description ==
The coca plant resembles a blackthorn bush, and grows to a height of 2 to 3 m (7 to 10 ft). The branches are curved, and the leaves are thin, opaque, oval, and taper at the extremities. A marked characteristic of the leaf is an areolated portion bounded by two longitudinal curved lines, one line on each side of the midrib, and more conspicuous on the under face of the leaf.

The flowers are small, and disposed in clusters on short stalks; the corolla is composed of five yellowish-white petals, the anthers are heart-shaped, and the pistil consists of three carpels united to form a three-chambered ovary. The flowers mature into red berries.

The leaves are sometimes eaten by the larvae of the moth Eloria noyesi.

Morphology of the coca plant
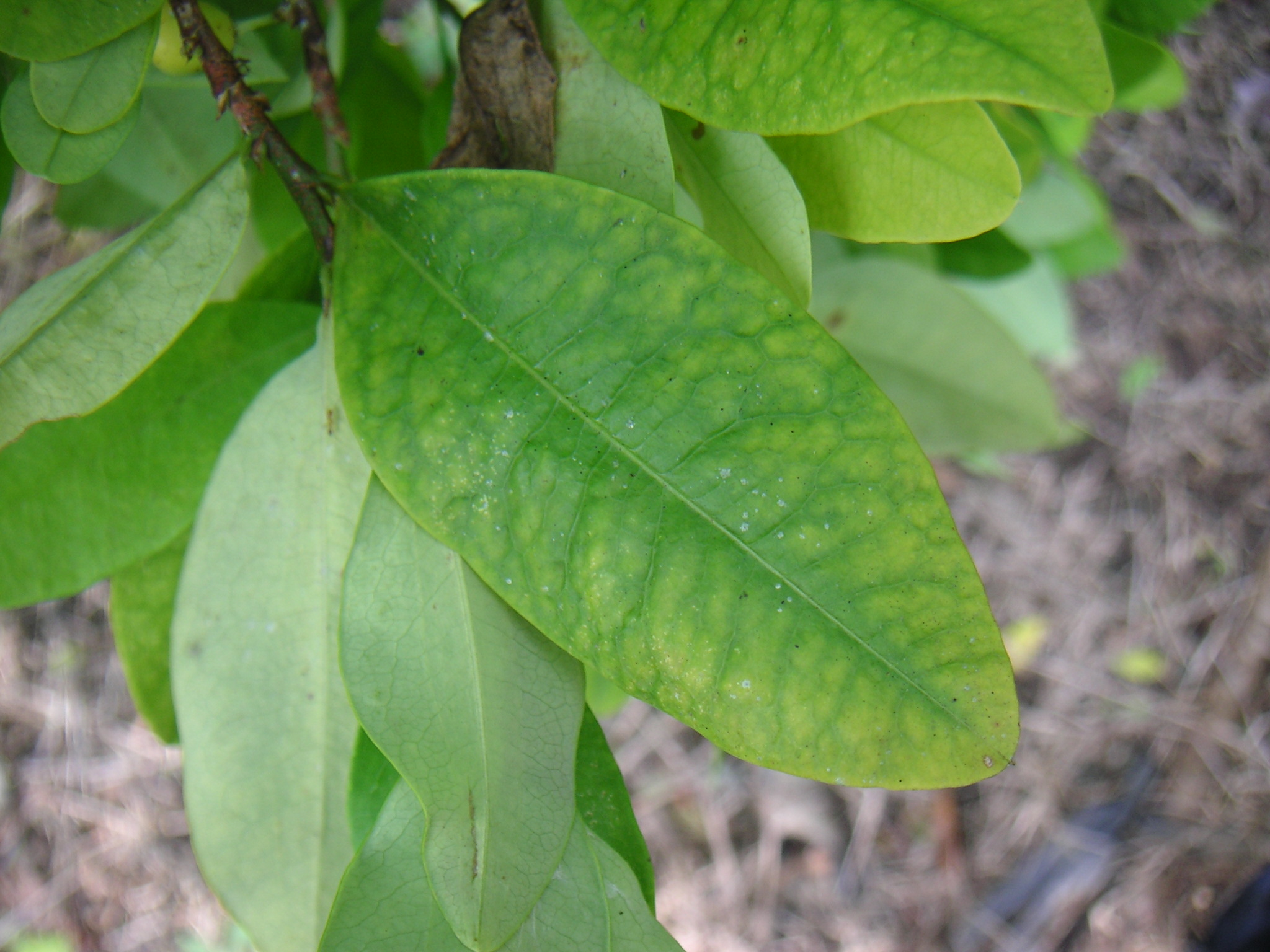
Leaves

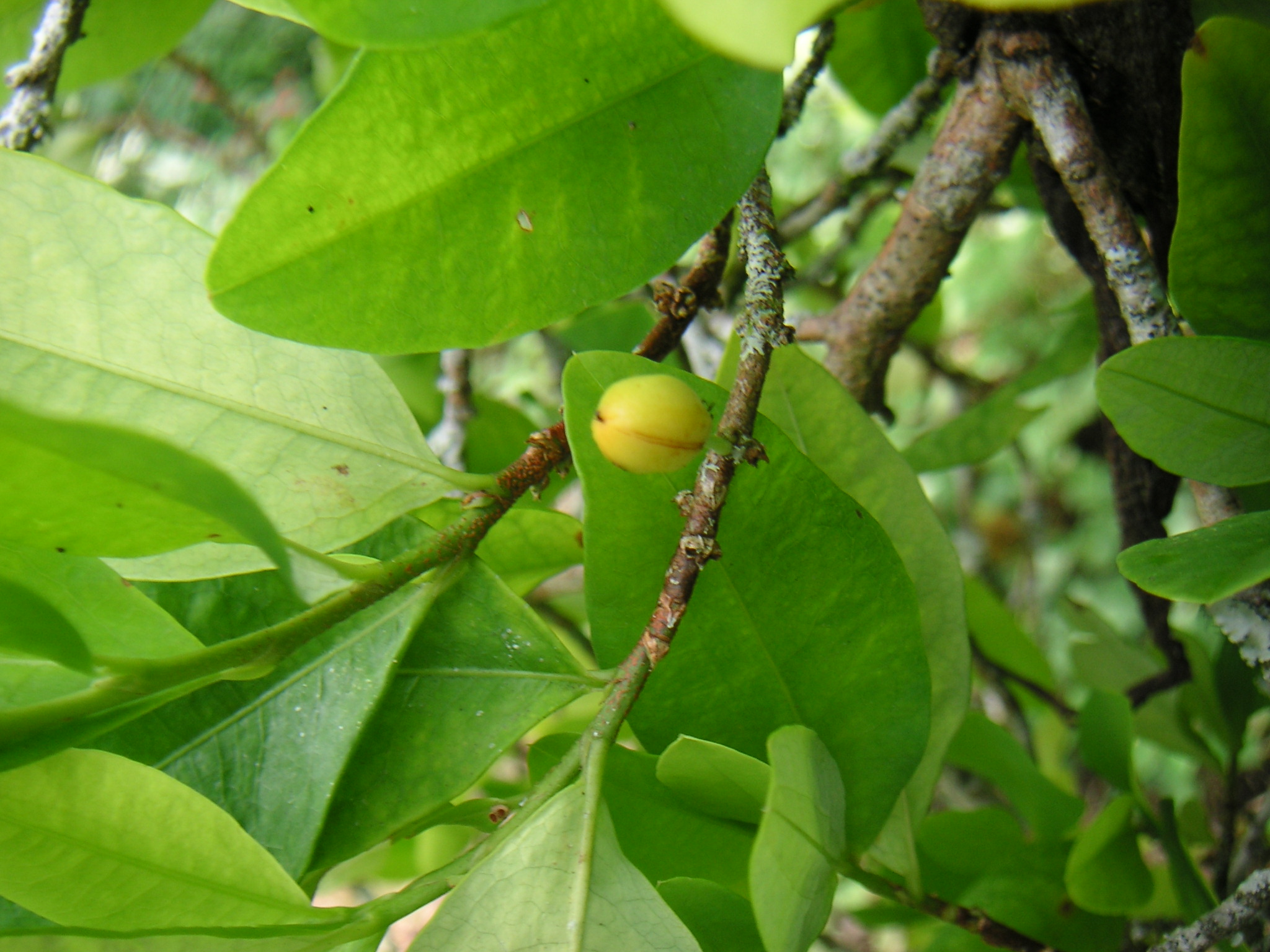
Leaves and fruit

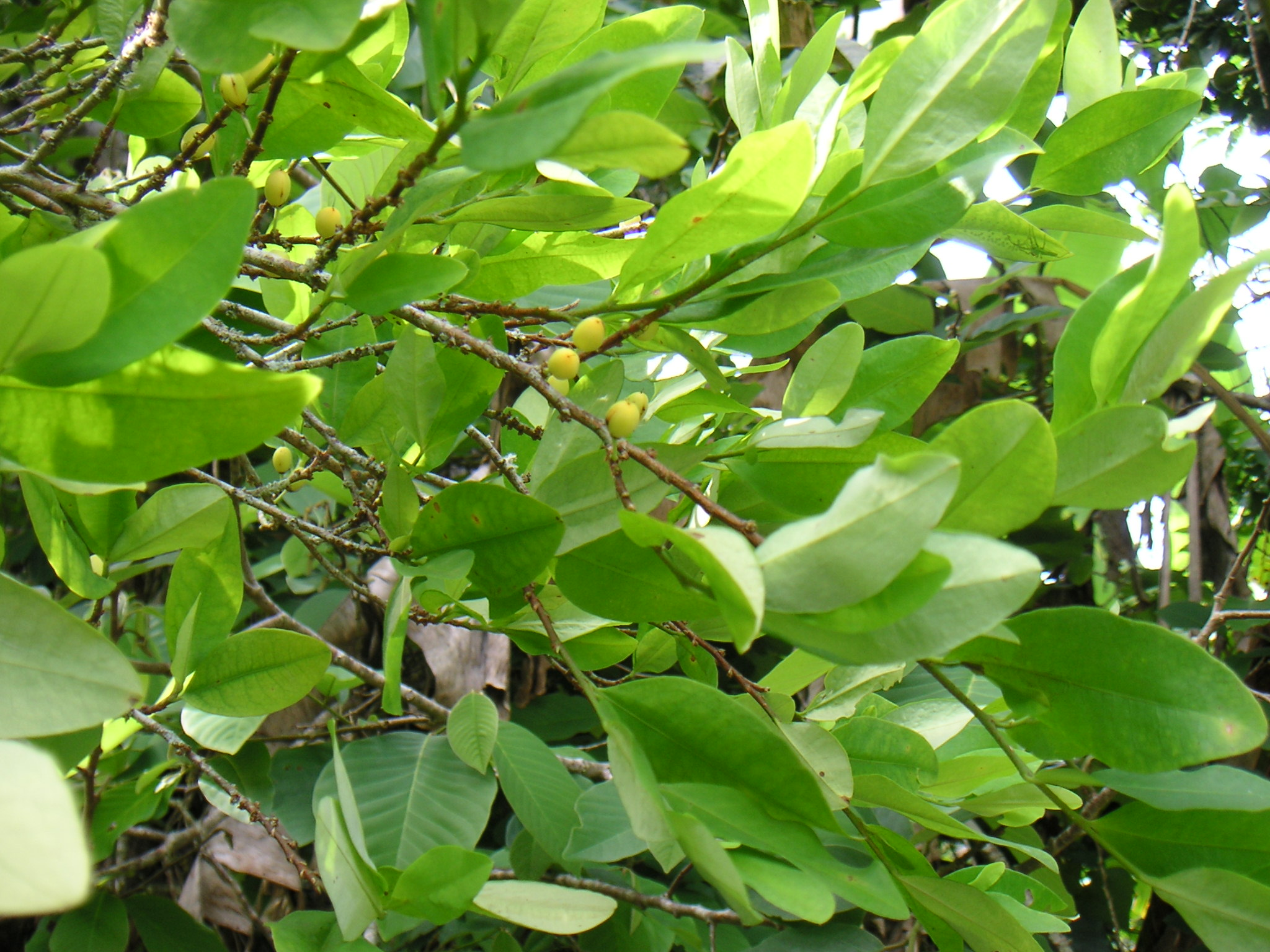
Leaves and branches

== Ecology ==
=== Species ===
There are two species of coca crops, each with two varieties:

- Erythroxylum coca
  - Erythroxylum coca var. coca (Bolivian or Huánuco coca) – well adapted to the eastern Andes of Peru and Bolivia, an area of humid, tropical, montane forest.
  - Erythroxylum coca var. ipadu (Amazonian coca) – cultivated in the lowland Amazon Basin in Peru and Colombia.
- Erythroxylum novogranatense
  - Erythroxylum novogranatense var. novogranatense (Colombian coca) – a highland variety that is utilized in lowland areas. It is cultivated in drier regions found in Colombia. However, E. novogranatense is very adaptable to varying ecological conditions. The leaves have parallel lines on either side of the central vein. These plants are called "Hayo" or "Ayu" among certain groups in Venezuela and Colombia.
  - Erythroxylum novogranatense var. truxillense (Trujillo coca) – grown primarily in the Cajamarca and Amazonas states in Peru, including for the Empresa Nacional de la Coca S.A. and export by Coca-Cola for beverage flavoring.

All four of the cultivated cocas were domesticated from Erythroxylum gracilipes in pre-Columbian times, with significant archaeological sites reaching from Colombia to northern Chile, including the Las Vegas Culture in Ecuador, the Huaca Prieta site in Peru, and the Nanchoc valley in Peru – where leaf fragments and slaked lime additives have been dated to over 8,000 years before present.

Boliviana negra, also known as supercoca or la millionaria, is a form of coca that is resistant to glyphosate, a herbicide. The emergence of this variety has been attributed to the coca eradication campaign undertaken by the government of Colombia known as Plan Colombia, whereby the aerial spraying of glyphosate onto fields of coca plants led to the discovery of resistant individuals that were spread between coca farmers. There is no evidence of genetic modification similar to glyphosate-resistant soybean plants produced by Monsanto.

=== Evolution ===
An initial theory of the origin and evolution of the cocas by Plowman and Bohm suggested that Erythroxylum coca var. coca is ancestral, while Erythroxylum novogranatense var. truxillense is derived from it to be drought tolerant, and Erythroxylum novogranatense var. novogranatense was further derived from Erythroxylum novogranatense var. truxillense in a linear series. In addition, E. coca var. ipadu was separately derived from E. coca var. coca when plants were taken into the Amazon basin.

Genetic evidence (Johnson et al. in 2005, Emche et al. in 2011, and Islam 2011) does not support this linear evolution. None of the four coca varieties are found in the wild, despite prior speculation by Plowman that wild populations of E. coca var. coca occur in the Huánuco and San Martín provinces of Peru. Recent phylogenetic evidence shows the closest wild relatives of the coca crops are Erythroxylum gracilipes and Erythroxylum cataractarum, and dense sampling of these species along with the coca crops from throughout their geographic ranges supports independent origins of domestication of Erythroxylum novogranatense and Erythroxylum coca from ancestor Erythroxylum gracilipes. It is possible that Amazonian coca was produced by yet a third independent domestication event from Erythroxylum gracilipes.

Thus, different early-Holocene peoples in different areas of South America independently transformed Erythroxylum gracilipes plants into quotidian stimulant and medicinal crops now collectively called coca.

== Cultivation ==
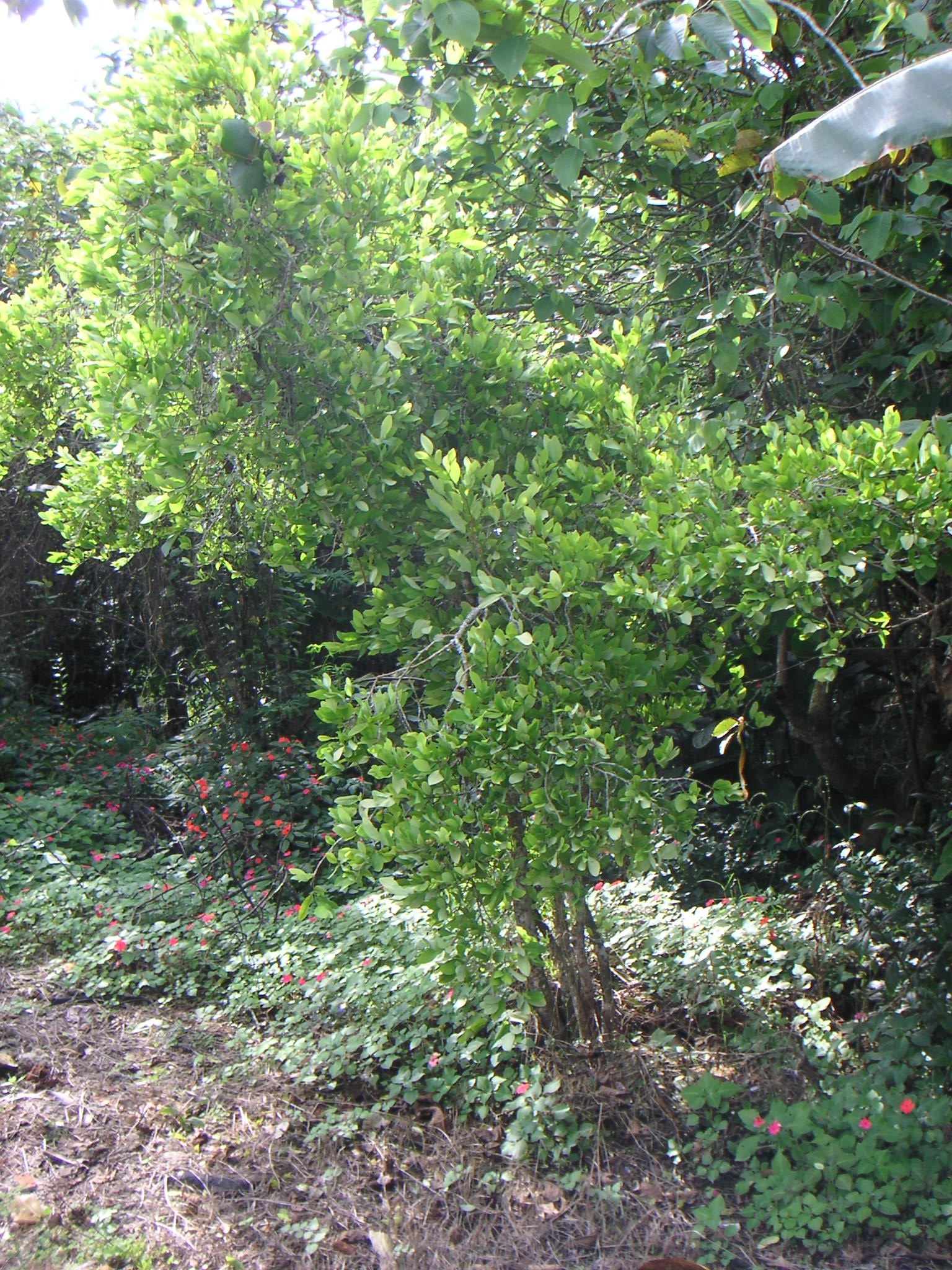
Coca tree in Colombia

The seeds are sown from December to January in small plots (almacigas) sheltered from the sun, and the young plants when at 40 to 60 cm (16 to 24 in) in height are placed in final planting holes (aspi), or if the ground is level, in furrows (uachos) in carefully weeded soil. The plants thrive best in hot, damp and humid locations, such as the clearings of forests; but the leaves most preferred are obtained in drier areas, on the hillsides. The leaves are gathered from plants varying in age from one and a half to upwards of forty years, but only the new fresh growth is harvested. They are considered ready for plucking when they break on being bent. The first and most abundant harvest is in March after the rainy season, the second is at the end of June, and the third in October or November. The green leaves (matu) are spread in thin layers on coarse woollen cloths and dried in the sun; they are then packed in sacks, which must be kept dry in order to preserve the quality of the leaves.

=== Distribution ===
According to a 2006 report by the United Nations Office on Drugs and Crime (UNODC), coca plants grow best in the humid, tropical climates and specific altitudes found in the Andean regions of South America, particularly in Bolivia, Colombia, and Peru, which together account for the vast majority of global coca cultivation—and produce 99% of all cocaine worldwide.

As of 2023, coca cultivation has also rapidly expanded into northern Central America, in the highland areas of Honduras, Guatemala, and Belize.

While regions like Taiwan and Java were prominent centers of coca leaf cultivation in Asia before World War II, their climates and soils remain highly suitable for large-scale coca production today. This historical precedent suggests that, if demand or policy ever shifted, these areas could once again support thriving coca plantations. These examples highlight that, despite their current historical status, such regions retain the biophysical capacity for renewed coca production on a significant scale.

==== Africa ====
Records indicate that coca has been grown in the African countries of Ghana, Ivory Coast, and West Cameroon. But there is no evidence that coca became a significant or economically important crop in these countries.

==== Asia ====
Taiwan (then known as Formosa) became the second-largest producer of coca leaves in Asia before World War II, surpassed only by Java, and played a crucial role in making Japan the world's leading exporter of cocaine.

Coca has been grown in Sri Lanka (then known as Ceylon) (De Witt, 1967).

Java (today part of Indonesia) became the world's leading exporter of coca leaf in the early 20th century, surpassing Peru by 1912 and maintaining this position until the late 1920s, except during World War I. The success of coca cultivation in Java demonstrates that the island's climate and soils were highly suitable for the coca plant, as evidenced by the thriving plantations and high yields recorded during this period.

==== Central America ====
In 2014, coca plantations were discovered in Mexico, and in 2020 in Honduras, which could have major implications for the illegal cultivation of the plant.

Since then coca production in Central America has surged dramatically. In 2022, authorities destroyed over 6.5 million coca plants in Honduras, 4 million in Guatemala, and more than half a million in southern Belize. By 2024, the number of coca plantations found and eradicated in Honduras had nearly doubled compared to the previous year, and a record number of processing labs were dismantled across the region. Unlike the Andes, where small farmers typically grow coca, cultivation in Central America is controlled by organized crime groups with backing from major foreign cartels. A 2024 study found that coca cultivation suitability increased most in northern Central America, particularly in Honduras, Guatemala, and El Salvador (collectively known as the Northern Triangle of Central America), and Belize. The study also reported that 47% of northern Central America—limited to Honduras, Guatemala, and Belize—has biophysical characteristics highly suitable for coca growing, suggesting that environmental factors are unlikely to limit the crop's spread in those countries. The latitudinal and altitudinal gradients of these countries are especially analogous to the altitudinal diversity of Colombia's coca cultivation zones, though their soils tend to fall near the upper limit of what is considered suitable for coca in Colombia.

==== South America ====
Coca is traditionally cultivated in the lower altitudes of the eastern slopes of the Andes (the Yungas), or the highlands depending on the species grown. Coca production begins in the valleys and upper jungle regions of the Andean region, where the countries of Colombia, Peru, and Bolivia are host to more than 98 percent of the global land area planted with coca; Coca production in Colombia takes place predominantly in the departments of Putumayo, Caquetá, Meta, Guaviare, Nariño, Antioquia, and Vichada. Bolivia's regions of Apolo, La Paz and Chapare are known for coca cultivation. Peru's primary coca growing and drug trafficking activities have been centered in the Upper Huallaga Valley since the 1980s.

Venezuela, once mainly a cocaine transit country, is now also producing cocaine, with coca cultivation and processing labs emerging in border and remote regions. While coca crops remain far smaller than in Colombia, their presence is growing, aided by Colombian armed groups and Venezuela's political and economic instability. The Maduro government is accused of tolerating and managing the drug trade to maintain power, while international oversight has diminished.

==== Other regions ====
Hawaii: In December 2017, Kauai police, working with several state and federal agencies, seized 15 mature coca plants—some up to six feet tall—and one pound of hashish during a two-day operation in Kalalau Valley, on Kauai in the state of Hawaii. The coca plants are notable because they are the source of cocaine's active ingredient. Kauai Police Chief Darryl Perry described the operation as a success in the ongoing fight against illegal drugs on the island.

== Pharmacological aspects ==
Cocaine, the psychoactive constituent of coca

The pharmacologically active ingredient of coca is the cocaine alkaloid, which has a concentration of about 0.3 to 1.5%, averaging 0.8%, in dry leaves. Besides cocaine, the coca leaf contains a number of other alkaloids, including methylecgonine cinnamate, benzoylecgonine, truxilline, hydroxytropacocaine, tropacocaine, ecgonine, cuscohygrine, dihydrocuscohygrine, and hygrine. When chewed, coca acts as a mild stimulant and suppresses hunger, thirst, pain, and fatigue. Absorption of coca from the leaf is less rapid than nasal application of purified forms of the alkaloid (almost all of the coca alkaloid is absorbed within 20 minutes of nasal application, while it takes 2–12 hours after ingestion of the raw leaf for alkaline concentrations to peak.). When the raw leaf is consumed in tea, between 59 and 90% of the coca alkaloid is absorbed.

Coca users ingest between 60 and 80 milligrams of cocaine each time they chew the leaves according to United Nations Office on Drugs and Crime (UNODC). The coca leaf, when consumed in its natural form, does not induce a physiological or psychological dependence, nor does abstinence after long-term use produce symptoms typical to substance addiction. Due to its alkaloid content and non-addictive properties, coca has been suggested as a method to help recovering cocaine addicts with tapering off the drug.

== History ==
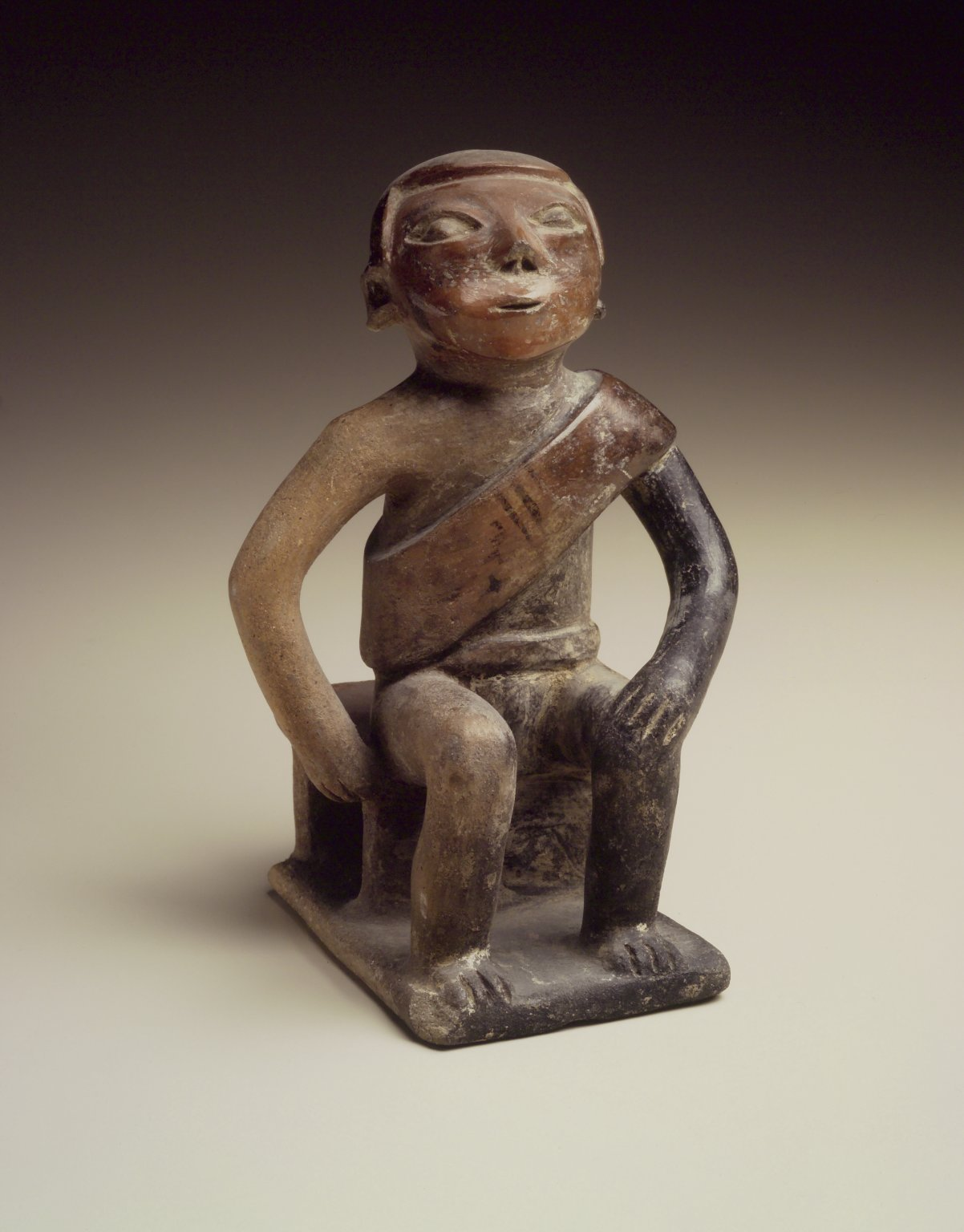
Coquero (Figure Chewing Coca), 850–1500 C.E. Brooklyn Museum

=== In South America ===
Traces of coca leaves found in northern Peru dates the communal chewing of coca with slaked lime 8,000 years back. Other evidence of coca traces have been found in mummies dating 3,000 years back in northern Chile. Beginning with the Valdivia culture, c. 3000 BC, there is an unbroken record of coca leaf consumption by successive cultures on the coast of Ecuador until European arrival, as shown in their ceramic sculpture and abundant caleros or lime pots. Lime containers found in the north coast of Peru date from around 2000 BC as evidenced by the findings at Huaca Prieta and the Jetetepeque river valley. Extensive archaeological evidence for the chewing of coca leaves dates back at least to the 6th century AD during the Moche period, and the subsequent Inca period, based on findings such as mummies found with a supply of coca leaves, pottery depicting the characteristic cheek bulge of a coca chewer, spatulas for extracting alkali, crafted bags for carrying coca leaves and lime, and gold representations of coca in the sacred gardens of the Inca in Cuzco.

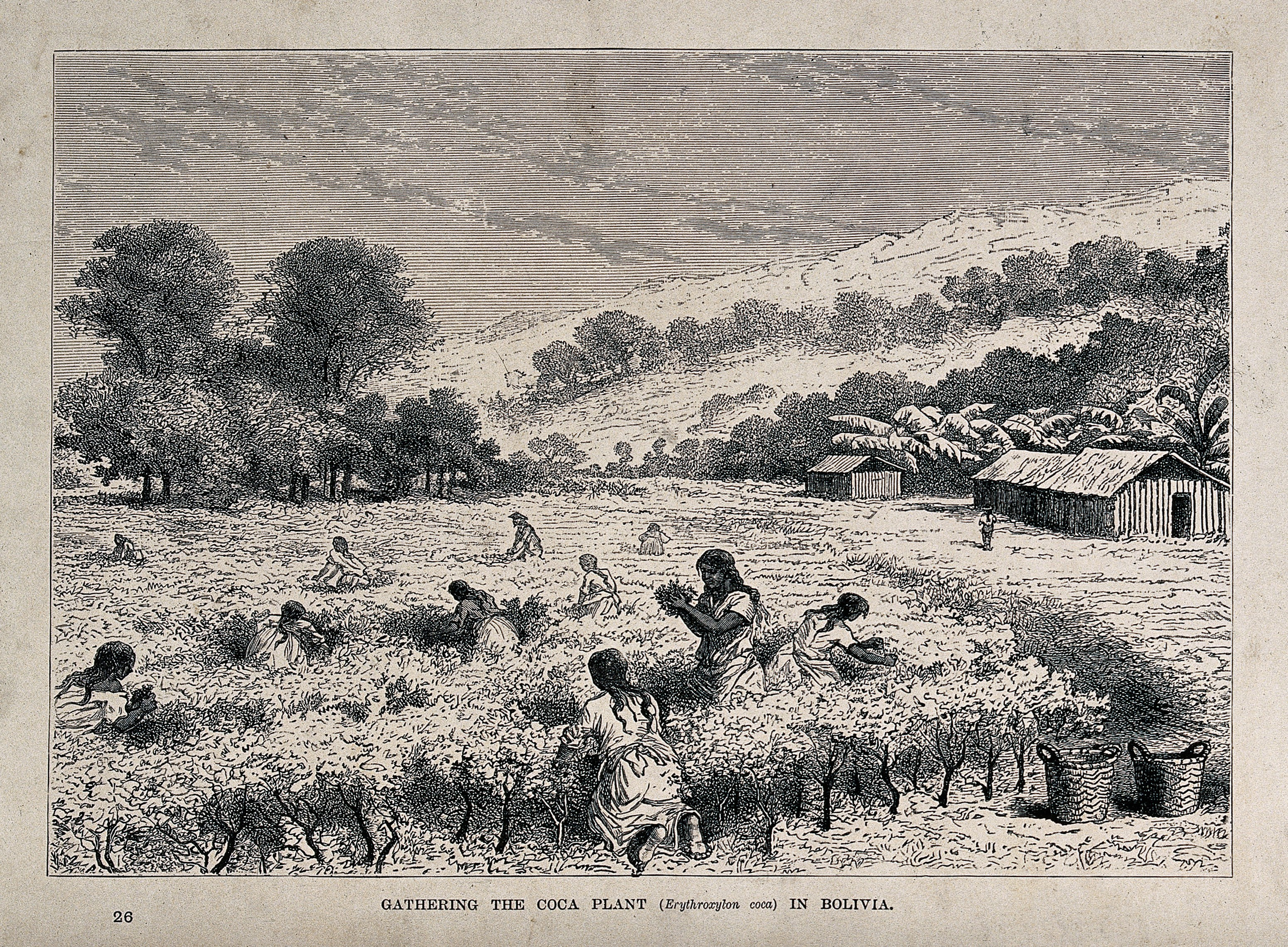
Women collecting coca leaves in Bolivia, wood engraving circa 1867

Coca chewing may originally have been limited to the eastern Andes before its introduction to the Inca. As the plant was viewed as having a divine origin, its cultivation became subject to a state monopoly and its use restricted to nobles and a few favored classes (court orators, couriers, favored public workers, and the army) by the rule of the Topa Inca (1471–1493). As the Incan empire declined, the leaf became more widely available. After some deliberation, Philip II of Spain issued a decree recognizing the drug as essential to the well-being of the Andean Indians but urging missionaries to end its religious use. The Spanish are believed to have effectively encouraged use of coca by an increasing majority of the population to increase their labor output and tolerance for starvation, but it is not clear that this was planned deliberately.

Andean peoples were the first to start chewing coca leaves (Erythroxylum). The practice later spread throughout the northern, central, and southern Andes, making its way down to Bolivia, Chile, and Argentina. The coca leaf itself includes the active alkaloid cocaine which can be released through chewing or consuming the plant in a powder-like form. The powder preparation was traditionally made by combining coca leaves with alkaline substances such as burnt plant ashes, limestone, granite, and seashells, which helps release the psychoactive compound. Although coca leaves themselves do not survive in archaeological artifacts, there is evidence that Andean people used it extensively, such as through discoveries of lime-processing tools.

The effects of the coca leaf are milder than those of the purified drug because the concentration of cocaine is much lower. Nevertheless, when Andean people first began to use the coca leaf, they noticed that it could produce a "high" and can be mildly addictive if consumed in large quantities. Many Andean civilizations like the Incas tended to chew the coca leaf instead of eating it as it provided a better "high" experience. Because of this, the Incas only allowed the substance within honorary celebrations and rituals. Workers dealing with rigorous tasks such as long-distance travel were allowed to take coca as it helped eased their fatigue. Evidence of coca use before the rise of Andean civilizations is sparse, making it difficult to ascertain how it was initially used and if it was restricted. Coca leaves were sometimes used as offerings during the Inca Empire due to their politics and religion, wealthy individuals handed out coca leaves during ritual ceremonies.

In recent times (2006), the governments of several South American countries, such as Peru, Bolivia and Venezuela, have defended and championed the traditional use of coca, as well as the modern uses of the leaf and its extracts in household products such as teas and toothpaste. The coca plant was also the inspiration for Bolivia's Coca Museum.

=== In Europe ===
Coca was first introduced to Europe in the 16th century, but did not become popular until the mid-19th century, with the publication of an influential paper by Dr. Paolo Mantegazza praising its stimulating effects on cognition. This led to the invention of coca wine and the first production of pure cocaine. Coca wine (of which Vin Mariani was the best-known brand) and other coca-containing preparations were widely sold as patent medicines and tonics, with claims of a wide variety of health benefits. The original version of Coca-Cola was among these. These products became illegal in most countries outside of South America in the early 20th century, after the addictive nature of cocaine was widely recognized. In 1859, Albert Niemann of the University of Göttingen became the first person to isolate the chief alkaloid of coca, which he named "cocaine".

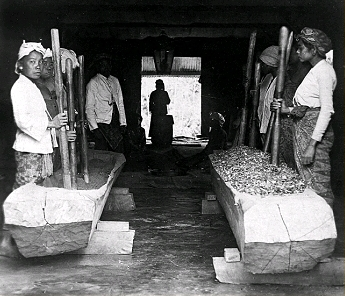
Workers in Java prepared coca leaves. This product was mainly traded in Amsterdam, and was further processed into cocaine (Dutch East Indies, before 1940).

In the early 20th century, the Dutch colony of Java became a leading exporter of coca leaf. By 1912 shipments to Amsterdam, where the leaves were processed into cocaine, reached 1000 tons, overtaking the Peruvian export market. Apart from the years of the First World War, Java remained a greater exporter of coca than Peru until the end of the 1920s. The Japanese had significant success growing coca in Formosa, and other colonial powers made relatively unsuccessful attempts, including the British in India.

== Coca use by the Incas ==
=== Ethnohistorical sources ===
While many historians are in agreement that coca was a contributing factor to the daily life of the Inca, there are many different theories as to how this civilization came to adopt it as one of its staple crops and as a valued commodity. The Incas were able to accomplish significant things while stimulated by the effects of coca. The Incas did not have a graphical written language, but used the quipu, a fiber recording device. Spanish documents make it clear that coca was one of the most important elements of Inca culture. Coca was used in Inca feasts and religious rituals, among many other things. It was a driving factor in the labor efforts that Inca kings asked of their citizens, and also used to barter for other goods. Coca was vital to the Inca civilization and its culture. The Incas valued coca so much that they colonized tropical rain forests to the north and east of their capital in Cuzco so that they could increase and control their supply. The Incas colonized more humid regions because coca cannot grow above 2600 meters in elevation (coca is not frost-resistant).

=== Coca use in labor and military service ===
One of the most common uses of coca during the reign of the Inca was in the context of mit'a labor, a labor tax required of all able-bodied men in the Inca empire, and also in military service. Pedro Cieza de León wrote that the indigenous people of the Andes always seemed to have coca in their mouths. Mit'a laborers, soldiers, and others chewed coca to alleviate hunger and thirst while they were working and fighting. The results of this are evident in monumental construction and the successful expansion of the Inca empire through conquest. By chewing coca, laborers and soldiers were able to work harder and for longer periods. Some historians believe that coca and chicha (fermented corn beer) made it possible for the Incas to move large stones in order to create architectural masterpieces, especially ones of monolithic construction such as Sacsayhuamán.

=== Coca use in religious rituals ===
Due to the Spanish conquest of the Inca Empire, the Spaniards had direct access to the Inca. They had insight to their everyday lives, and it is through their lens that we learn about religion in the Inca Empire. While the indigenous author Pedro Cieza de León wrote about the effects coca had on the Inca, multiple Spanish men wrote about the importance of coca in their spirituality. For example Pedro Sarmiento de Gamboa, Father Bernabé Cobo, and Juan de Ulloa Mogollón noted how the Incas would leave coca leaves at important locations throughout the empire. They considered coca to be the highest form of plant offering that the Incas made.

The Incas would put coca leaves in the mouths of mummies, which were a sacred part of Inca culture. Mummies of Inca emperors were regarded for their wisdom and often consulted for important matters long after the body had deteriorated. Not only did many Inca mummies have coca leaves in their mouths, but they also carried coca leaves in bags. These are believed to be Inca sacrifices, and like the Aztecs, the Inca participated in sacrifices as well. It is clear that the Incas had a strong belief in the divinity of the coca leaf as there is now evidence that both the living and the dead were subjected to coca use. They even sent their sacrifices off to their death with a sacrificial bag of coca leaves. The coca leaf affected all stages of life for the Inca. Coca was also used in divination as ritual priests would burn a mixture of coca and llama fat and predict the future based on the appearance of the flame.

=== Coca use after the Spanish invasion and colonization ===
After the Spanish invasion and colonization of the Inca Empire, the use of coca was restricted and appropriated by the Spaniards. By many historical accounts, the Spaniards made haphazard attempts to eradicate the coca leaf from Inca life. Although the Spaniards reported state-controlled storage facilities that the Inca had built to distribute to its workers, The Spanish allowed local communities to continue to use coca to endure the labor associated with working conditions. After seeing the effects and powers of the coca plant, many Spaniards saw another opportunity and started growing and selling coca themselves.

== Traditional uses ==
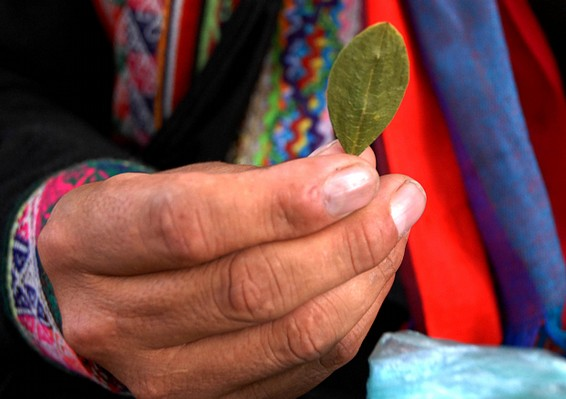
Man holding coca leaf in Bolivia

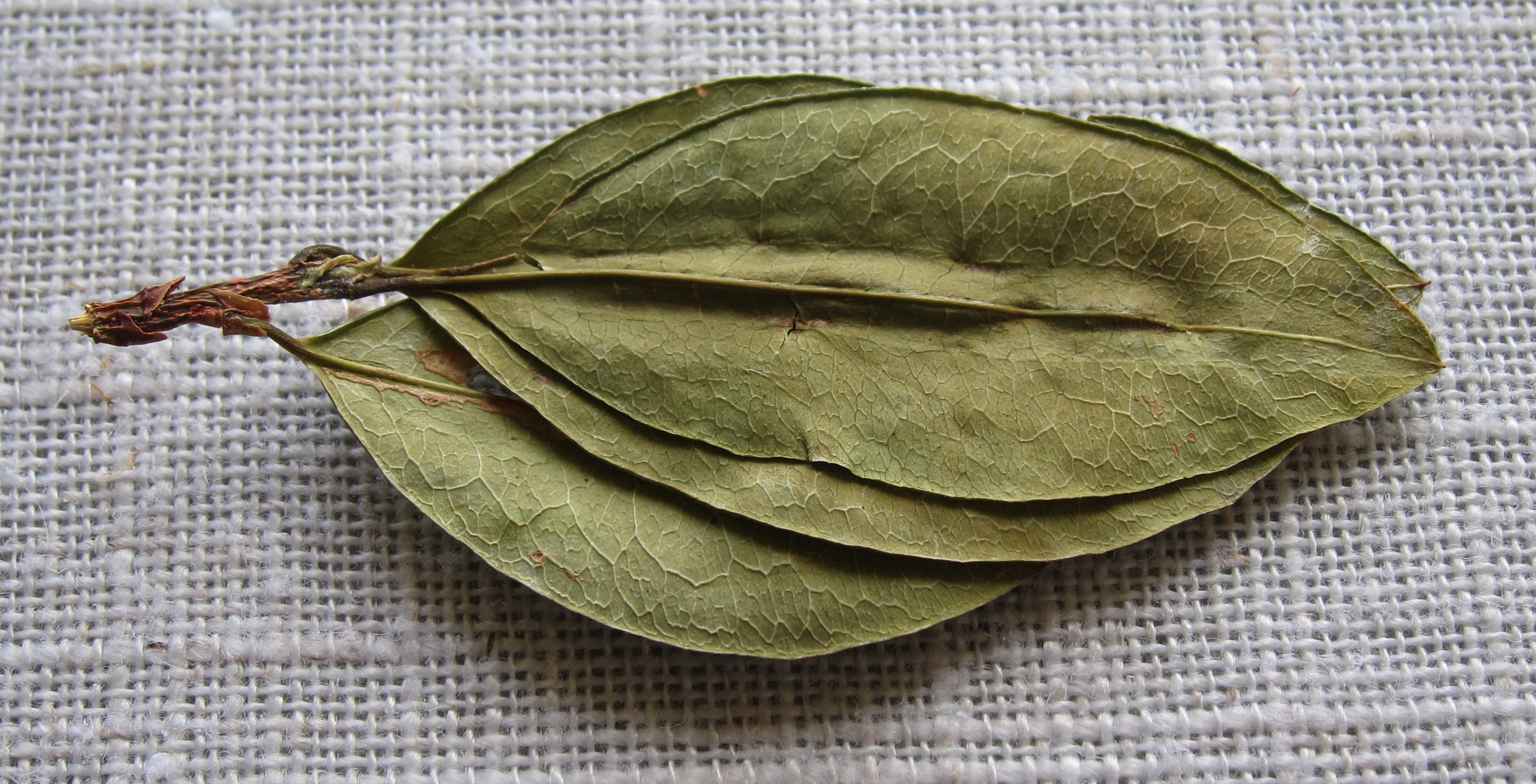
Three coca leaves on one stem are lucky in Quechuan folklore

=== Medicine ===
Traditional medical uses of coca are foremost as a stimulant to overcome fatigue, hunger, and thirst. It is considered particularly effective against altitude sickness. It also is used as an anesthetic and analgesic to alleviate the pain of headache, rheumatism, wounds and sores, etc. Before stronger anaesthetics were available, it also was used for broken bones, childbirth, and during trepanning operations on the skull. The high calcium content in coca explains why people used it for bone fractures. Because coca constricts blood vessels, it also serves to oppose bleeding, and coca seeds were used for nosebleeds. Indigenous use of coca has also been reported as a treatment for malaria, ulcers, asthma, to improve digestion, to guard against bowel laxity, as an aphrodisiac, and credited with improving longevity. Modern studies have supported a number of these medical applications.

=== Nutrition ===
Raw coca leaves, chewed or consumed as tea or mate de coca, are rich in nutritional properties. Specifically, the coca plant contains essential minerals (calcium, potassium, phosphorus), vitamins (B1, B2, C, and E) and nutrients such as protein and fiber.

=== Religion ===
Coca has also been a vital part of the religious cosmology of the Andean peoples of Peru, Chile, Bolivia, Ecuador, Colombia and northwest Argentina from the pre-Inca period through to the present. Coca leaves play a crucial part in offerings to the apus (mountains), Inti (the sun), or Pachamama (the earth). Coca leaves are also often read in a form of divination analogous to reading tea leaves in other cultures. As one example of the many traditional beliefs about coca, it is believed by the miners of Cerro de Pasco to soften the veins of ore, if masticated (chewed) and thrown upon them (see Cocamama in Inca mythology). In addition, coca use in shamanic rituals is well documented wherever local native populations have cultivated the plant. For example, the Tayronas of Colombia's Sierra Nevada de Santa Marta would chew the plant before engaging in extended meditation and prayer.

=== Chewing ===
In Bolivia bags of coca leaves are sold in local markets and by street vendors. The activity of chewing coca is called mambear, chacchar or acullicar, borrowed from Quechua, coquear (Northwest Argentina), or in Bolivia, picchar, derived from the Aymara language. The Spanish masticar is also frequently used, along with the slang term "bolear," derived from the word "bola" or ball of coca pouched in the cheek while chewing. Typical coca consumption varies between 20 and 60 grams per day, and contemporary methods are believed to be unchanged from ancient times. Coca is kept in a woven pouch (chuspa or huallqui). A few leaves are chosen to form a quid (acullico) held between the mouth and gums. Doing so may cause a tingling and numbing sensation in the mouth, in similar fashion to the formerly ubiquitous dental anaesthetic novocaine (as both cocaine and novocaine belong to the amino ester class of local anesthetics).

Chewing coca leaves is most common in indigenous communities across the central Andean region, particularly in places like the highlands of Argentina, Colombia, Bolivia, and Peru, where the cultivation and consumption of coca is a part of the national culture, similar to chicha. It also serves as a powerful symbol of indigenous cultural and religious identity, amongst a diversity of indigenous nations throughout South America. Chewing plants for medicinal mostly stimulating effects has a long history throughout the world: khat in East Africa and the Arabian Peninsula, tobacco in North America, pituri in Australia, and areca nut in South/Southeast Asia and the Pacific Basin. Tobacco leaves were also traditionally chewed in the same way in North America (modern chewing tobacco is typically heavily processed). Khat chewing also has a history as a social custom dating back thousands of years analogous to the use of coca leaves.

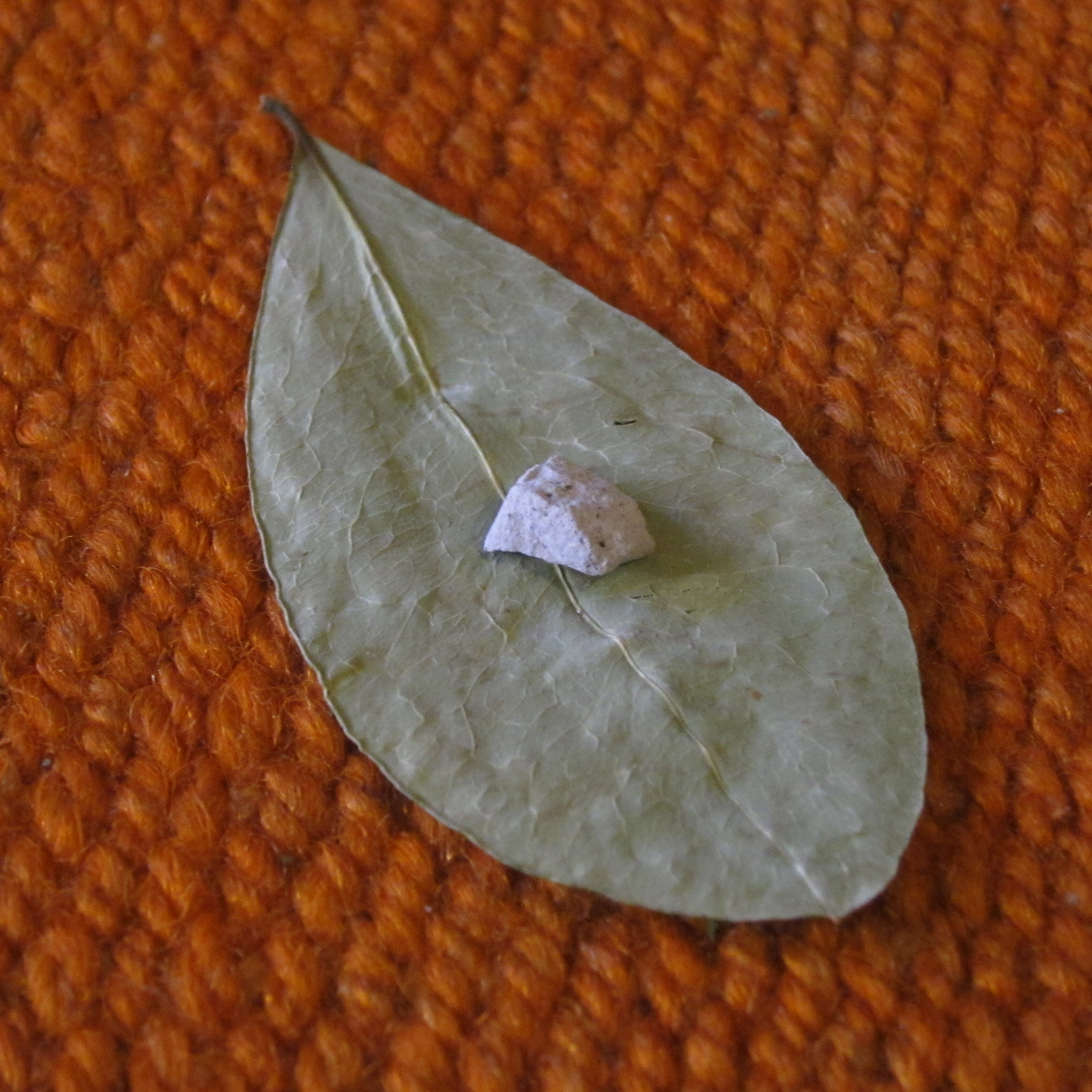
Llipta is used to improve extraction when chewing coca (Museo de la Coca, Cusco, Peru).

One option for chewing coca is with a tiny quantity of ilucta (a preparation of the ashes of the quinoa plant) added to the coca leaves; it softens their astringent flavor and activates the alkaloids. Other names for this basifying substance are llipta in Peru and the Spanish word lejía, bleach in English. The consumer carefully uses a wooden stick (formerly often a spatula of precious metal) to transfer an alkaline component into the quid without touching his flesh with the corrosive substance. The alkali component, usually kept in a gourd (ishcupuro or poporo), can be made by burning limestone to form unslaked quicklime, burning quinoa stalks, or the bark from certain trees, and may be called llipta, tocra or mambe depending on its composition. Many of these materials are salty in flavor, but there are variations. The most common base in the La Paz area of Bolivia is a product known as lejía dulce (sweet lye), which is made from quinoa ashes mixed with aniseed and cane sugar, forming a soft black putty with a sweet and pleasing flavor. In some places, baking soda is used under the name bico.

In the Sierra Nevada de Santa Marta, on the Caribbean Coast of Colombia, coca is consumed by the Kogi, Arhuaco, and Wiwa by using a special device called poporo. The poporo is the mark of manhood; it is regarded by men as a good companion that means "food", "woman", "memory", and "meditation". When a boy is ready to be married, his mother initiates him in the use of the coca. This act of initiation is carefully supervised by the Mamo, a traditional priest-teacher-leader.

Fresh samples of the dried leaves, uncurled, are a deep green colour on the upper surface, and a grey-green on the lower surface, and have a strong tea-like aroma. When chewed, they produce a pleasurable numbness in the mouth, and have a pleasant, pungent taste. They are traditionally chewed with slaked lime or some other reagent such as bicarbonate of soda to increase the release of the active ingredients from the leaf. Older species have a camphoraceous smell and a brownish color, and lack the pungent taste. See also Erythroxylum coca, and Erythroxylum novogranatense spp.

Ypadú is an unrefined, unconcentrated powder made from coca leaves and the ash of various other plants.

=== Tea ===
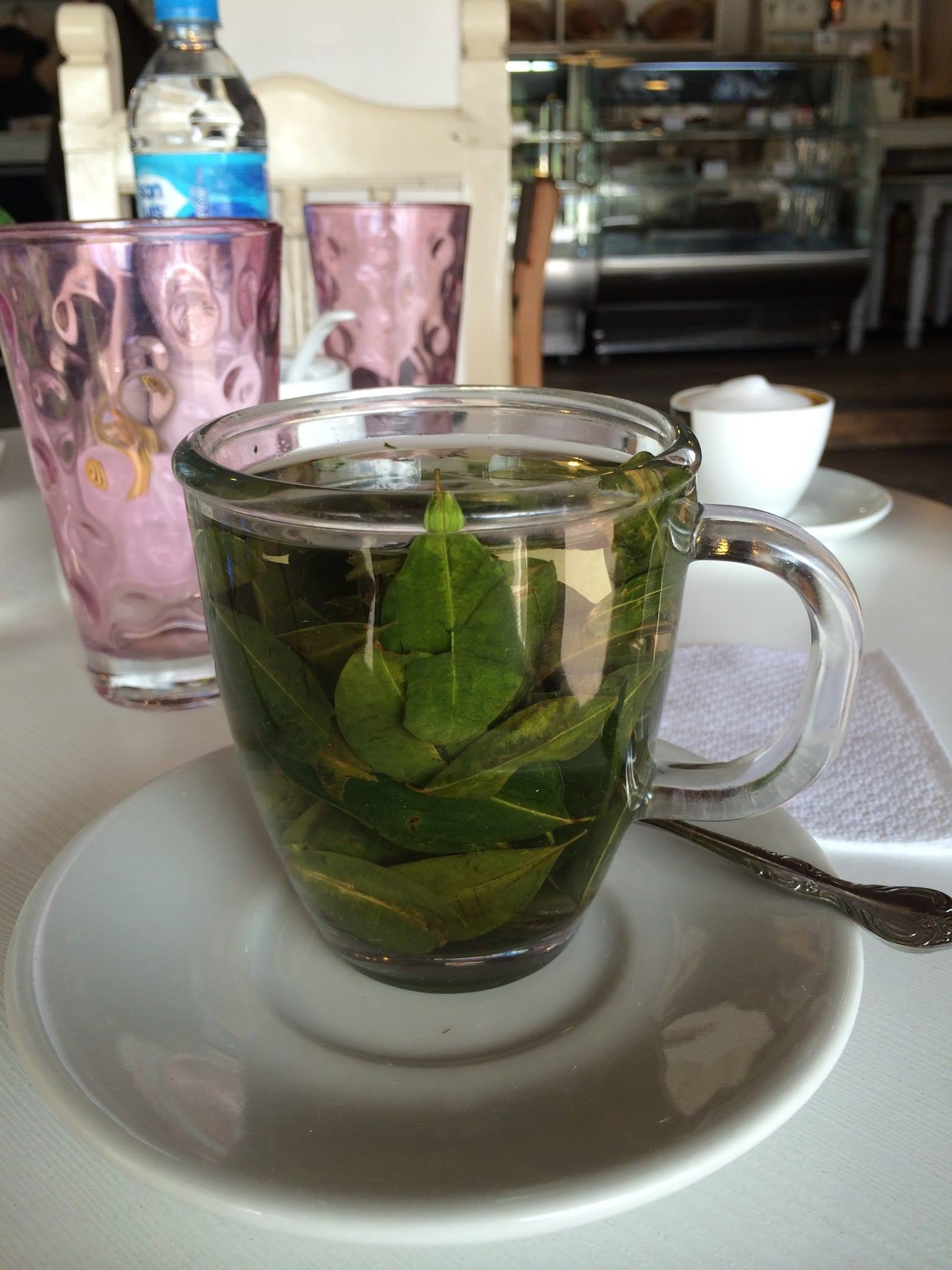
A cup of mate de coca served in a coffee shop in Cuzco, Peru

Although coca leaf chewing is common only among the indigenous populations, the consumption of coca tea (Mate de coca) is common among all sectors of society in the Andean countries, especially due to their high elevations from sea level, and is widely held to be beneficial to health, mood, and energy. Coca leaf is sold packaged into teabags in most grocery stores in the region, and establishments that cater to tourists generally feature coca tea. Coca tea is legal in Colombia, Peru, Bolivia, Argentina, and Ecuador.

== Commercial and industrial uses ==
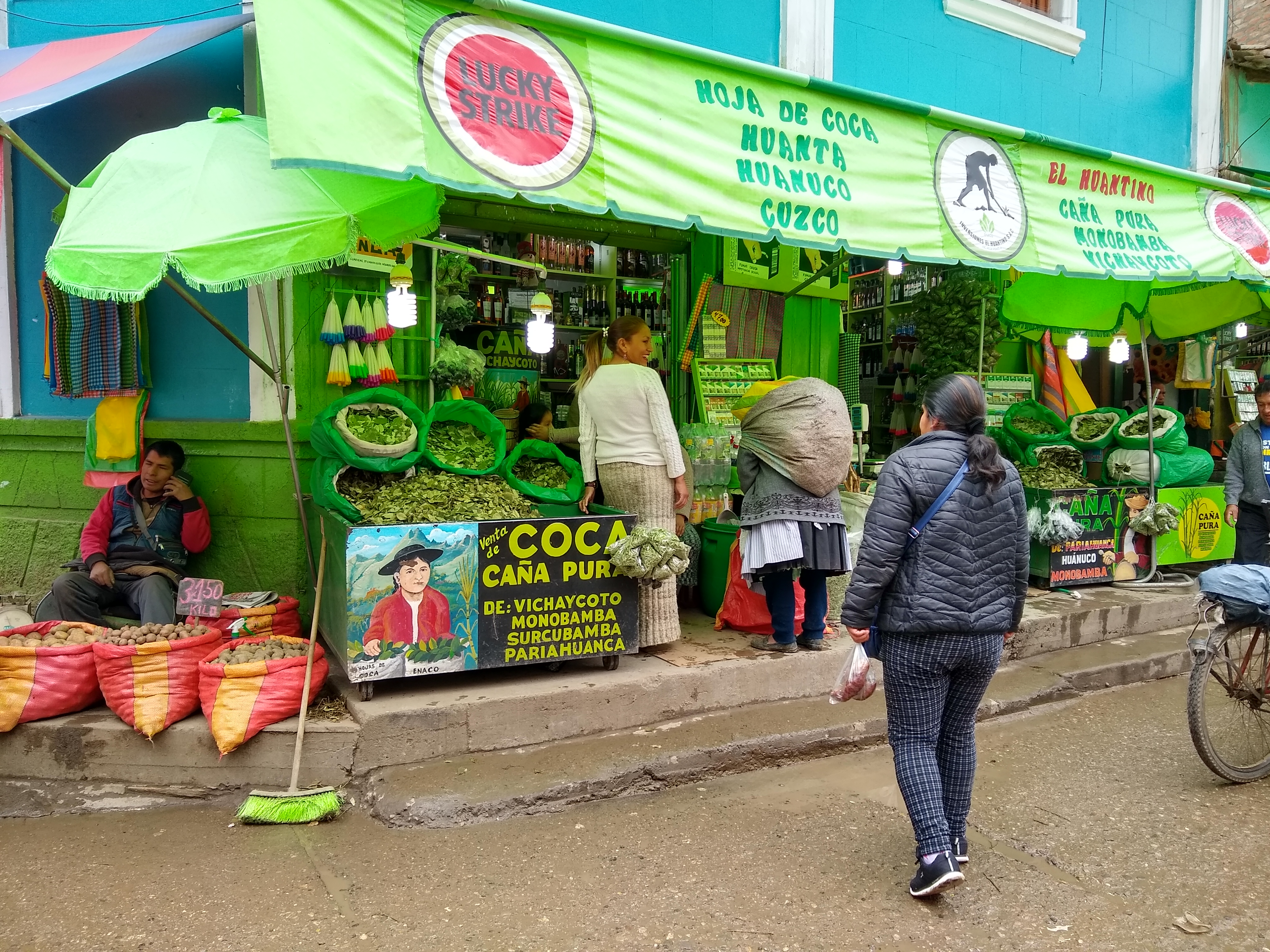
Store selling coca leaf in Peru

In the Andes, commercially manufactured coca teas, granola bars, cookies, hard candies, etc. are available in most stores and supermarkets, including upscale suburban supermarkets.

Coca is used industrially in the cosmetics and food industries. A decocainized extract of coca leaf is one of the flavoring ingredients in Coca-Cola. Before the criminalization of cocaine, however, the extract was not decocainized, and hence Coca-Cola's original formula did indeed include cocaine.

Coca tea is produced industrially from coca leaves in South America by a number of companies, including Enaco S.A. (National Company of the Coca), a government enterprise in Peru. Coca leaves are also found in a brand of herbal liqueur called "Agwa de Bolivia" (grown in Bolivia and de-cocainized in Amsterdam), and a natural flavouring ingredient in Red Bull Cola, that was launched in March 2008.

=== New markets ===
Coca has figured more prominently in the politics of Bolivia and Peru in the early 21st century. President Morales asserted that "la coca no es cocaína"—the coca leaf is not cocaine. During his speech to the General Assembly of the United Nations on September 19, 2006, he held a coca leaf in his hand to demonstrate its innocuity.

Alan García, former president of Peru, has recommended its use in salads and other edible preparations. A Peruvian-based company has announced plans to market a modern version of Vin Mariani, which will be available in both natural and de-cocainized varieties.

In Venezuela, former president Hugo Chávez said in a speech in January 2008 that he chews coca every day, and that his "hook up" is Bolivian president Evo Morales. Chávez reportedly said "I chew coca every day in the morning... and look how I am" before showing his biceps to his audience, the Venezuelan National Assembly.

On the other hand, the Colombian government has recently moved in the opposite direction. For years, Bogotá has allowed indigenous coca farmers to sell coca products, promoting the enterprise as one of the few successful commercial opportunities available to recognized tribes like the Nasa, who have grown it for years and regard it as sacred. In December 2005, the Paeces – a Tierradentro (Cauca) indigenous community – started to produce a carbonated soft drink called "Coca Sek". The production method belongs to the resguardos of Calderas (Inzá) and takes about 150 kg (331 lb) of coca per 3,000 produced bottles. The drink was never sold widely in Colombia and efforts to do so ended in May 2007 when it was abruptly banned by the Colombian government.

Coca Colla is an energy drink which is produced in Bolivia with the use of coca extract as its base. It was launched on the Bolivian markets in La Paz, Santa Cruz, and Cochabamba in mid-April 2010.

== Literary references ==
Probably the earliest reference to coca in English literature is in "Pomona", the fifth book of Abraham Cowley's posthumously published Latin work, Plantarum libri sex (1668; translated as Six Books of Plants in 1689). In the series of Aubrey–Maturin novels by Patrick O'Brian, set during the Napoleonic wars, Dr. Stephen Maturin, a naval physician, naturalist, and British intelligence agent discovers the use of coca leaves on a mission to Peru, and makes regular use of them in several of the later novels in the series.

== International prohibition of coca leaf ==
Coca leaf is the raw material for the manufacture of the drug cocaine, a powerful stimulant and anaesthetic extracted chemically from large quantities of coca leaves. Today, since it has mostly been replaced as a medical anaesthetic by synthetic analogues such as procaine, cocaine is best known as an illegal recreational drug. The cultivation, sale, and possession of unprocessed coca leaf (but not of any processed form of cocaine) is generally legal in the countries – such as Bolivia, Peru, Chile, and Argentine Northwest – where traditional use is established, although cultivation is often restricted in an attempt to control the production of cocaine.

The prohibition of the use of the coca leaf except for medical or scientific purposes was established by the United Nations in the 1961 Single Convention on Narcotic Drugs. The coca leaf is listed on Schedule I of the 1961 Single Convention together with cocaine and heroin. The Convention determined that "The Parties shall so far as possible enforce the uprooting of all coca bushes which grow wild. They shall destroy the coca bushes if illegally cultivated" (Article 26), and that, "Coca leaf chewing must be abolished within twenty-five years from the coming into force of this Convention" (Article 49, 2.e).

The historic rationale for international prohibition of coca leaf in the 1961 Single Convention comes from "The Commission of Enquiry on the Coca Leaf study" published in 1950. It was requested of the United Nations by the permanent representative of Peru, and was prepared by a commission that visited Bolivia and Peru briefly in 1949 to "investigate the effects of chewing the coca leaf and the possibilities of limiting its production and controlling its distribution." It concluded that the effects of chewing coca leaves were negative, even though chewing coca was defined as a habit, not an addiction.

The report was sharply criticised for its arbitrariness, lack of precision, and racist connotations. The team members' professional qualifications and parallel interests were also criticised, as were the methodology used and the incomplete selection and use of existing scientific literature on the coca leaf. Questions have been raised as to whether a similar study today would pass the scrutiny and critical review to which scientific studies are routinely subjected.

Despite the legal restriction among countries party to the international treaty, coca chewing and drinking of coca tea is carried out daily by millions of people in the Andes as well as considered sacred within indigenous cultures. Coca consumers claim that most of the information provided about the traditional use of the coca leaf and its modern adaptations is erroneous. This has made it impossible to shed light on the plant's positive aspects and its potential benefits for the physical, mental, and social health of the people who consume and cultivate it.

In an attempt to obtain international acceptance for the legal recognition of traditional use of coca in their respective countries, Peru and Bolivia successfully led an amendment, paragraph 2 of Article 14 into the 1988 United Nations Convention Against Illicit Traffic in Narcotic Drugs and Psychotropic Substances, stipulating that measures to eradicate illicit cultivation and to eliminate illicit demand "should take due account of traditional licit use, where there is historic evidence of such use." Bolivia also made a formal reservation to the 1988 Convention, which required countries to adopt measures to establish the use, consumption, possession, purchase or cultivation of the coca leaf for personal consumption as a criminal offence. Bolivia stated that "the coca leaf is not, in and of itself, a narcotic drug or psychotropic substance" and stressed that its "legal system recognizes the ancestral nature of the licit use of the coca leaf, which, for much of Bolivia's population, dates back over centuries."

However, the International Narcotics Control Board (INCB) – the independent and quasi-judicial control organ for the implementation of the United Nations drug conventions – denied the validity of article 14 in the 1988 Convention over the requirements of the 1961 Convention, or any reservation made by parties, since it does not "absolve a party of its rights and obligations under the other international drug control treaties."

The INCB stated in its 1994 Annual Report that "mate de coca, which is considered harmless and legal in several countries in South America, is an illegal activity under the provisions of both the 1961 Convention and the 1988 Convention, though that was not the intention of the plenipotentiary conferences that adopted those conventions." It implicitly also dismissed the original report of the Commission of Enquiry on the Coca Leaf by recognizing that "there is a need to undertake a scientific review to assess the coca-chewing habit and the drinking of coca tea."

Nevertheless, the INCB on other occasions did not show signs of an increased sensitivity towards the Bolivian claim on the rights of their indigenous population, and the general public, to consume the coca leaf in a traditional manner by chewing the leaf, and drinking coca tea, as "not in line with the provisions of the 1961 Convention." The Board considered Bolivia, Peru and a few other countries that allow such practises to be in breach with their treaty obligations, and insisted that "each party to the Convention should establish as a criminal offence, when committed intentionally, the possession and purchase of coca leaf for personal consumption."

In reaction to the 2007 Annual Report of the INCB, the Bolivian government announced that it would formally issue a request to the United Nations to unschedule the coca leaf of List 1 of the 1961 UN Single Convention. Bolivia led a diplomatic effort to do so beginning in March 2009, but eighteen countries out of a total of 184, those 18 being, listed chronologically: the United States, Sweden, United Kingdom, Latvia, Japan, Canada, France, Germany, Bulgaria, Slovakia, Denmark, Estonia, Italy, Mexico, Russian Federation, Malaysia, Singapore, and Ukraine, objected to the change before the January 2011 deadline. A single objection would have been sufficient to block the modification. The legally unnecessary step of supporting the change was taken formally by Spain, Ecuador, Venezuela, and Costa Rica. In June 2011, Bolivia moved to denounce the 1961 Convention over the prohibition of the coca leaf.

At Bolivia's initiative, organized by Colombia and Bolivia with the support of Canada, Czech Republic, Malta, Mexico, Switzerland and OHCHR, the World Health Organization (WHO), is conducting a 'critical review' of the coca leaf. In 2025, based on its findings, the WHO may recommend changes in coca's classification under the UN drug control treaties.

Since the 1980s, the countries in which coca is grown have come under political and economic pressure from the United States to restrict the cultivation of the crop in order to reduce the supply of cocaine on the international market.

Article 26 of the Single Convention on Narcotic Drugs requires nations that allow the cultivation of coca to designate an agency to regulate said cultivation and take physical possession of the crops as soon as possible after harvest, and to destroy all coca which grows wild or is illegally cultivated. The effort to enforce these provisions, referred to as coca eradication, has involved many strategies, ranging from aerial spraying of herbicides on coca crops to assistance and incentives to encourage farmers to grow alternative crops.

This effort has been politically controversial, with proponents claiming that the production of cocaine is several times the amount needed to satisfy legal demand and inferring that the vast majority of the coca crop is destined for the illegal market. As per the proclaimed view, this not only contributes to the major social problem of drug abuse but also financially supports insurgent groups that collaborate with drug traffickers in some cocaine-producing territories. Critics of the effort claim that it creates hardship primarily for the coca growers, many of whom are poor and have no viable alternative way to make a living, causes environmental problems, that it is not effective in reducing the supply of cocaine, in part because cultivation can move to other areas, and that any social harm created by drug abuse is only made worse by the war on drugs. The environmental problems include "ecocide", where vast tracts of land and forest are sprayed with glyphosate or Roundup, with the intention of eradicating the coca plant. However, the incidental environmental damage is severe, because many plant species are wiped out in the process.

Coca has been reintroduced to the United States as a flavoring agent in the herbal liqueur Agwa de Bolivia.

Boliviana negra, a genetically engineered type of coca, resists glyphosate herbicides and increases yields.

== Legal status ==
The primary organization authorized to purchase coca leaves is ENACO S.A., headquartered in Peru. Outside of South America, most countries' laws make no distinction between the coca leaf and any other substance containing cocaine, so the possession of coca leaf is prohibited. In South America coca leaf is illegal in both Paraguay and Brazil.

=== Netherlands ===
In the Netherlands, coca leaf is legally in the same category as cocaine, as both are List I drugs of the Opium Law. The Opium Law specifically mentions the leaves of the plants of the genus Erythroxylon. However, the possession of living plants of the genus Erythroxylon is not actively prosecuted, even though they are legally forbidden.

=== United States ===
Like cocaine, coca is controlled under the Controlled Substances Act (CSA) as a Schedule II drug meaning it is a restricted drug and is illegal to process without a prescription or a DEA registration.

In the United States, a Stepan Company plant in Maywood, New Jersey is a registered importer of coca leaf. The company manufactures pure cocaine for medical use and also produces a cocaine-free extract of the coca leaf, which is used as a flavoring ingredient in Coca-Cola. Other companies that have registrations with the DEA to import coca leaf according to 2011 Federal Register Notices for Importers, include Johnson Matthey, Inc, Pharmaceutical Materials; Mallinckrodt Inc; Penick Corporation; and the Research Triangle Institute. Analysts have noted the substantial importation of coca leaf into the United States, but the actual quantity is unknown because much of it is illegally imported, and there are many reports of coca leaves and coca teas being sold in the United States and being seized by the Drug Enforcement Administration throughout the States and Territories of the United States.

=== Canada ===
Coca leaf is listed as a Schedule I drug (most dangerous) according to the Controlled Drugs and Substances Act of Canada (S.C. 1996, c. 19) alongside Opium (Heroin) and synthetic opioid analgesics. Specifically, it lists Coca (Erythroxylon), its preparations, derivatives, alkaloids, and salts, including:(1) Coca leaves (2) Cocaine and (3) Ecgonine. Possession of a Schedule I substance is illegal and trafficking can result in punishment of up to life imprisonment.

=== Australia ===
Coca leaf is considered a Schedule 9 prohibited substance in Australia under the Poisons Standard (October 2015). A Schedule 9 substance is a substance which may be abused or misused, the manufacture, possession, sale or use of which should be prohibited by law except when required for medical or scientific research, or for analytical, teaching or training purposes with approval of Commonwealth and/or State or Territory Health Authorities.

=== India ===
Coca leaf is a controlled narcotic drug in India by the Narcotic Drugs and Psychotropic Substances Act, 1985 which is the principal legislation governing the subject. While its scientific and medical purposes are permissible in accordance with law, any other indulgence including cultivation, possession, sale, consumption, transportation, import, export, are prohibited.

== See also ==
- Alcohol and Drugs History Society
- Illegal drug trade in Latin America
