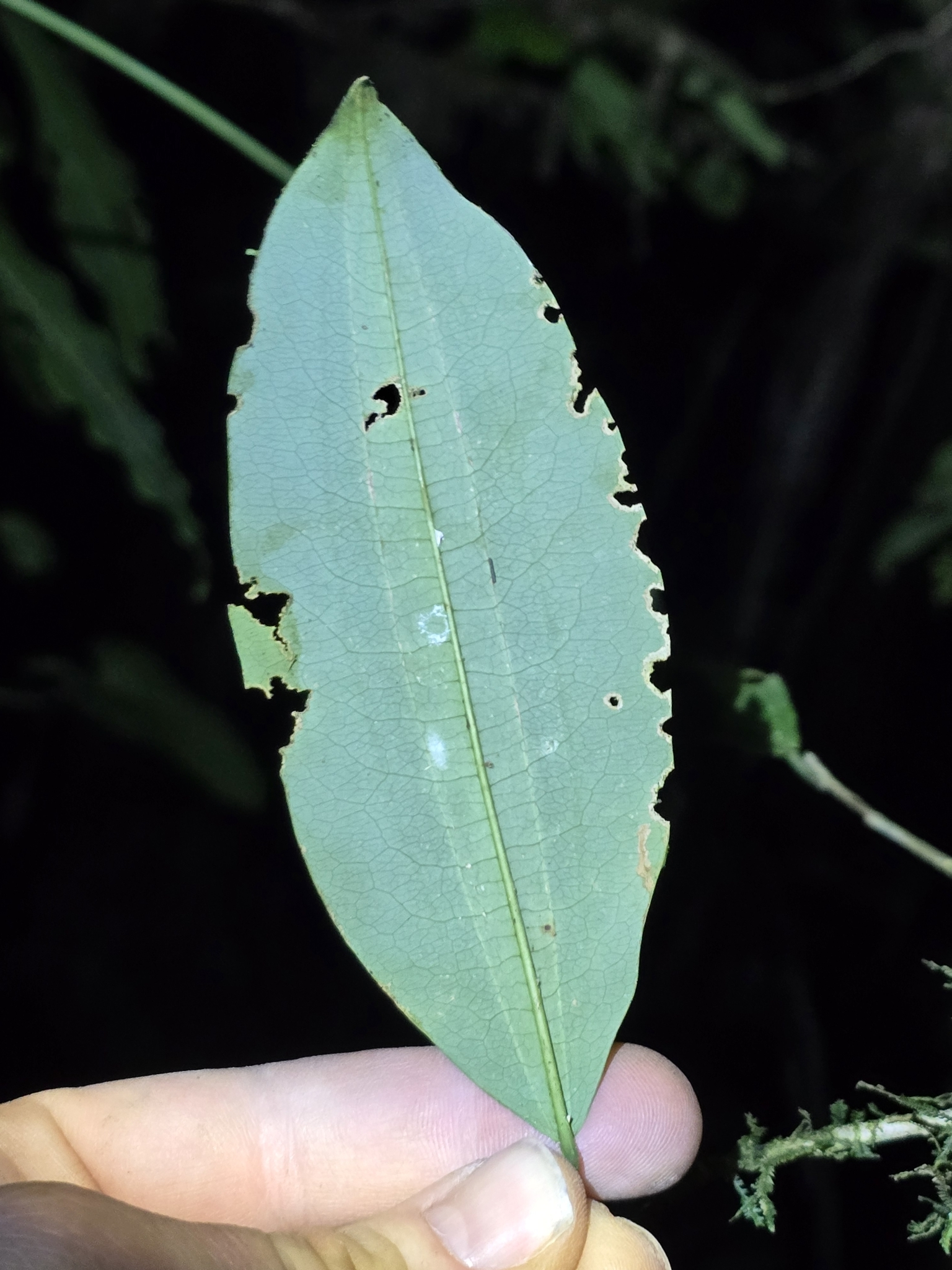

Scientific classification
- Kingdom: Plantae
- Clade: Tracheophytes
- Clade: Angiosperms
- Clade: Eudicots
- Clade: Rosids
- Order: Malpighiales
- Family: Erythroxylaceae
- Genus: Erythroxylum
- Species: E. gracilipes

Binomial name
- Erythroxylum gracilipes Peyr.

= Erythroxylum gracilipes =

Species of plant

Erythroxylum gracilipes is a species of flowering plant in the family Erythroxylaceae. It is native to Central and South Tropical America.
