= Legal status of cocaine =

The legal status of cocaine varies worldwide. While many countries have banned its sale for recreational use, some have legalized possession, personal use, transportation, or cultivation; others have decriminalized it for certain purposes. It is important to distinguish cocaine from coca leaves and the coca plant itself.

== List by country ==
Country	Possession	Sale	Transport	Cultivation	Notes
Afghanistan	Illegal	Illegal	Illegal	Illegal	All use, sale, possession, transportation, and cultivation of cocaine is illegal, cocaine and coca plants are less common in Afghanistan than opium.
Argentina	Decriminalized for private use	Illegal	Illegal	Illegal	All use, sale, possession, transportation, and cultivation of cocaine was made fully illegal in Argentina's Law 23.737. However, in 2009, a judge ruled that banning the possession of drugs when it posed no threat to others violates the constitutional right to personal liberty. While cocaine hasn't been officially decriminalized some extend the 2009 ruling to cocaine possession.
Armenia	Illegal	Illegal	Illegal	Illegal	All use, sale, possession, transportation, and cultivation of cocaine is illegal.
Albania	Illegal	Illegal	Illegal	Illegal	Possession and cultivation of cocaine are both illegal. Transportation and sale is illegal under Law No 8874 and Law No 7975.
Australia	Decriminalized in certain territories under certain quantities	Illegal	Illegal	Illegal	Australia includes cocaine as a drug of dependence; thus, it is illegal to use, sell, possess, transport, and cultivate it except for medical uses. Recently the Australian Capital Territory has decriminalized possession under 1.5 grams to encourage users to seek treatment.
Bahamas	Illegal	Illegal	Illegal	Illegal	All use, sale, possession, transportation, and cultivation of cocaine is illegal.
Bangladesh	Illegal	Illegal	Illegal	Illegal	All use, sale, possession, transportation and cultivation of cocaine is illegal.
Bolivia	Legal up to 50 grams of cocaine powder (around 50 grams of the product for personal use but not for sale)	Illegal	Illegal	Legal	Limited private cultivation of coca is legal in Bolivia, where chewing the leaves and drinking coca tea are considered cultural practices, particularly in mountainous regions.
Brazil	Decriminalized for private use	Illegal	Illegal	Illegal	Public consumption and selling of cocaine are considered crimes. Punishments for public consumption include a warning about the drug's effects, community service (5 to 10 months), and educational courses or programs. Punishment for the sale of cocaine is 5 to 15 years of jail, a R$500–1,500 fine and course or program attendance. The specific punishments are based on individual judge discretion.
Canada	Illegal, decriminalized in the Province of British Columbia	Legal medically	Legal medically	Legal medically	Possession and use is illegal. Consumption, possession, purchasing and trading of cocaine is outlawed. Cocaine remains a Schedule I controlled substance. Effective January 31, 2023, possession up to 2.5 grams of cocaine, opioids, methamphetamine and MDMA by adults (age 18 and over, excluding members of the Canadian Armed Forces unless otherwise authorized) is decriminalized in the province of British Columbia due to the Health Canada mandate.
Colombia	Decriminalized (up to 1 gram for personal use)	Illegal	Illegal	Legal (Coca Plants for authorized traditional use by indigenous communities and coca chewing)	Since 1994, possession of 1 gram of cocaine has been decriminalized for personal use. Sale, production, and distribution of cocaine, including personal production and gifting, remain illegal. Possession of up to 1 gram for personal use is decriminalized under the 1994 Constitutional Court ruling (C-221/94), meaning it is not a criminal offense, but acquisition of the drug is still illegal.
Czech Republic	Decriminalized (up to 1 gram)	Illegal	Illegal	Illegal	Possession of up to 1 gram for personal use is punishable by a fine of up to 15000 CZK according to Aict 167/1998 §39,. Possession of a higher amount is illegal according to the criminal code, with up to a 10-year sentence as punishment. Trafficking is punishable by 10–18 years in prison, depending on the scale and other circumstances.
China	Illegal	Illegal	Illegal	Illegal	All use, sale, possession, transportation, and cultivation of cocaine is illegal.
Chile	Illegal	Illegal	Illegal	Illegal	All use, sale, possession, transportation, and cultivation of cocaine is illegal.
Denmark	Illegal	Illegal	Illegal	Illegal	All use, sale, possession, transportation, and cultivation of cocaine is illegal.
Ecuador	Illegal	Illegal	Illegal	Illegal	Drug use itself is not criminalized in Ecuador, but possession with intent to sell is. From 2014 to 2023, the possession of small amounts of cocaine was decriminalized, but this was repealed due to abuse in order to conduct "micro-trafficking".
Finland	Illegal	Illegal	Illegal	Illegal	All use, sale, possession, transportation, and cultivation of cocaine is illegal.
Germany	Legal medically, decriminalized	Illegal	Illegal	Illegal	Possession of cocaine without a medical prescription is illegal. Small amounts for personal consumption may go unpunished for first-time or non-regular offenders; however, this varies by state. Usually revocation of a driving license will follow from confiscation of any drug except marijuana, since drug users are considered a road hazard.
Greece	Decriminalized for private use	Legal only for medical reasons and with license by government	Illegal	Illegal	Use, possession and cultivation of class B drugs is illegal in Greece except for medical reasons. Possession for one's own exclusive use is not punishable by law. However, use in public is punished with detention up to six months.
India	Illegal	Illegal	Illegal	Illegal	All use, sale, possession, transportation, and cultivation of cocaine is illegal.
Ireland	Illegal	Illegal	Illegal	Illegal	All use, sale, possession, transportation, and cultivation of cocaine is illegal.
Israel	Illegal	Illegal	Illegal	Illegal	All use, sale, possession, transportation, and cultivation of cocaine is illegal.
Italy	Decriminalized	Illegal	Illegal	Illegal	Cocaine possession and consumption in small amounts is decriminalized, but the sale, trade, production and transportation of cocaine are all considered felonies in Italy.
Japan	Illegal	Illegal	Illegal	Illegal	The maximum penalty for cocaine consumption is 7 years in jail.
Jordan	Illegal	Illegal	Illegal	Illegal	All use, possession, sale, cultivation, and production of cocaine is fully illegal and forbidden even for medical or scientific reasons. Drug trafficking and drug sales are punishable by the death penalty.
Luxembourg	Illegal	Illegal	Illegal	Illegal	Use and possession of cocaine is illegal.
Malaysia	Illegal	Illegal	Illegal	Illegal	Use and possession of cocaine is illegal and is punishable by death.
Mexico	Decriminalized (up to 1/2 Gram)	Illegal	Illegal	Illegal	There is no penalty for carrying up to 1/2 gram of cocaine. However, possession of larger amounts is illegal and liable to punishment by the law.
Netherlands	Illegal but unenforced (small amounts)	Illegal	Illegal	Illegal	Cocaine is considered an illegal hard drug. Possession, production and trade are not allowed as stated in the Opium Law of 1928. Although technically illegal, possession of less than half a gram usually goes unpunished.
New Zealand	Illegal	Illegal	Illegal	Illegal	Cocaine is a Class A drug. The coca leaf and preparations of cocaine containing no more than 0.1% cocaine base (in such a way that the cocaine cannot be recovered) are both classified as Class C, and their possession is punishable with three months imprisonment or a fine of $500.
Nigeria	Illegal	Illegal	Illegal	Illegal	It is illegal to import, export, manufacture, process, produce, transport, traffic, sell, buy, smoke, inhale, inject, or possess cocaine.
Norway	Illegal	Illegal	Illegal	Illegal	All usage, selling, cultivation and transportation of cocaine are illegal.
North Korea	Illegal	Illegal	Illegal	Illegal	Use and possession of cocaine is illegal.
Pakistan	Illegal	Illegal	Illegal	Illegal	Use and possession of cocaine is illegal.
Palestine	Unenforced	Unenforced	Unenforced	Unenforced	In the West Bank cocaine is fully illegal. In the Gaza Strip, distribution and sale of cocaine is a criminal offense but is unenforced due to the war between Israel and Palestine.
Philippines	Illegal	Illegal	Illegal	Illegal	Use and possession of cocaine is illegal. Possession of cocaine is explicitly named as an illegal substance under the Comprehensive Dangerous Drugs Act of 2002. The possession of 10 grams or more of cocaine or cocaine hydrochloride is punishable by imprisonment up to a maximum life sentence.
Peru	Legal (up to 2 grams of cocaine or 5 grams of cocaine-freebase)	Illegal	Illegal	Legal (Coca Plants)	Cultivation of coca plants is legal, and coca leaves are sold openly on markets. Similarly to Bolivia, chewing leaves and drinking coca tea are cultural practices. Possession of up to 2 grams of cocaine or up to 5 grams of coca paste is legal for personal use in Peru per Article 299 of the Peruvian Penal Code. If a person possess two or more kinds of drugs at the same time, it is considered criminal offense.
Poland	Illegal	Illegal	Illegal	Illegal	Possession of cocaine is punishable by up to 3 years of imprisonment, or in cases involving a significant quantity, between 1 and 10 years of imprisonment.
Portugal	Decriminalized up to 2 grams	Illegal	Illegal	Illegal	Personal use of cocaine is decriminalized. Drug abuse is dealt with by administrative and medical intervention. Trafficking is illegal.
Romania	Legal medically with a prescription	Illegal	Illegal	Illegal	All activities associated with cocaine (with the exception of possession for medicinal purposes) are illegal in Romania per Law 143/2000.
Saudi Arabia	Illegal	Illegal	Illegal	Illegal	Drug trafficking is punishable by death, with drug consumption punishable with sentences of 2–4 years in prison. Narcotics users are jailed for two years and further punished based on a judge's decision. Offenders who are foreigners are deported from the Kingdom. Narcotics users who voluntarily enroll in treatment programmes are not punished, but instead admitted into a specialised hospital. Saudi law, in accordance with United Nation recommendations, treats narcotic addicts as patients who need treatment.
Singapore	Illegal	Illegal	Illegal	Illegal	Trafficking of over 3 grams is punishable by death.
South Africa	Illegal	Illegal	Illegal	Illegal	It is a criminal offense to possess cocaine.
Spain	Decriminalized with a fine	Illegal	Illegal	Illegal	The sale of cocaine is strictly illegal, but private use and personal cocaine consumption is decriminalized with a spot fine only.
Switzerland	Possession of small amounts decriminalized	Illegal	Illegal	Illegal	Traffickers of cocaine are sentenced with jail. Personal use is punished with a fine. According to a recent study, 5 Swiss cities (St Gallen, Bern, Zurich, Basel and Geneva) were listed among the top 10 European cities for cocaine use. Personal consumption and possession of small amounts, or sharing with adults free of charge, is not liable to prosecution based on the Swiss federal law.
Sweden	Illegal	Illegal	Illegal	Illegal	Sweden is known and infamous for have a zero tolerance policy regarding drug trafficking, drug consumption and drug abuse.
Syria	Illegal but unenforced due the Syrian civil war	Illegal but unenforced	Illegal but unenforced	Illegal but unenforced	Cocaine is illegal in Syria, however due to the Syrian civil war this is rarely enforced, and its sale, production, possession, and consumption is rarely punished. The Assad regime was known for financing state sponsored drug trafficking and for being heavily funded by Syrian drug cartels.
Thailand	Illegal	Illegal	Illegal	Illegal	Thailand is very strict on drugs and it is common to be stopped, searched, and asked to give urine samples on the street, especially in Bangkok. Being caught with the intent to sell is punishable by 10 years to life in prison. Consumption for personal use is punishable by 1–10 years in prison, a fine, or both.
Ukraine	Illegal	Illegal	Illegal	Illegal	Public drug consumption is outlawed and punishable by prison time or with jail punishment, but private consumption of drugs is not enforced and is not considered as a crime or offence.
United Arab Emirates	Illegal	Illegal	Illegal	Illegal	Cocaine trafficking is punishable by capital punishment, and drug consumption is punishable with four years in prison.
United Kingdom	Illegal	Illegal	Illegal	Illegal	Cocaine was first made illegal by the Dangerous Drugs Act 1920 (10 & 11 Geo. 5. c. 46). It is now classed as a Class A drug, controlled by the Misuse of Drugs Act 1971 (c. 38). Possession carries a punishment of up to 7 years in prison, an unlimited fine, or both. Supply or production carries a punishment of up to life in prison, an unlimited fine, or both. It is legal for medical use under schedule 2 of the Misuse of Drugs Regulations 2001 (SI 2001/3998).
United States	Legal medically, decriminalized in the state of Oregon	Legal medically	Legal medically	Legal medically	Cocaine is a Schedule II drug under the Controlled Substances Act permitting certain medical use under strict medical supervision and medical control but otherwise is outlawed.
Venezuela	Illegal	Illegal	Illegal	Illegal	Cocaine possession is illegal in Venezuela but is decriminalized for up to two grams for personal use. Sales and trafficking are illegal, and can be punished with imprisonment between 8 and 18 years depending on quantity, Venezuela is known for having an state sponsored drug cartel known as the Cartel of the Suns led by the Venezuelan president Nicolas Maduro .
Country	Possession	Sale	Transport	Cultivation	Notes
