= Coca production in Colombia =

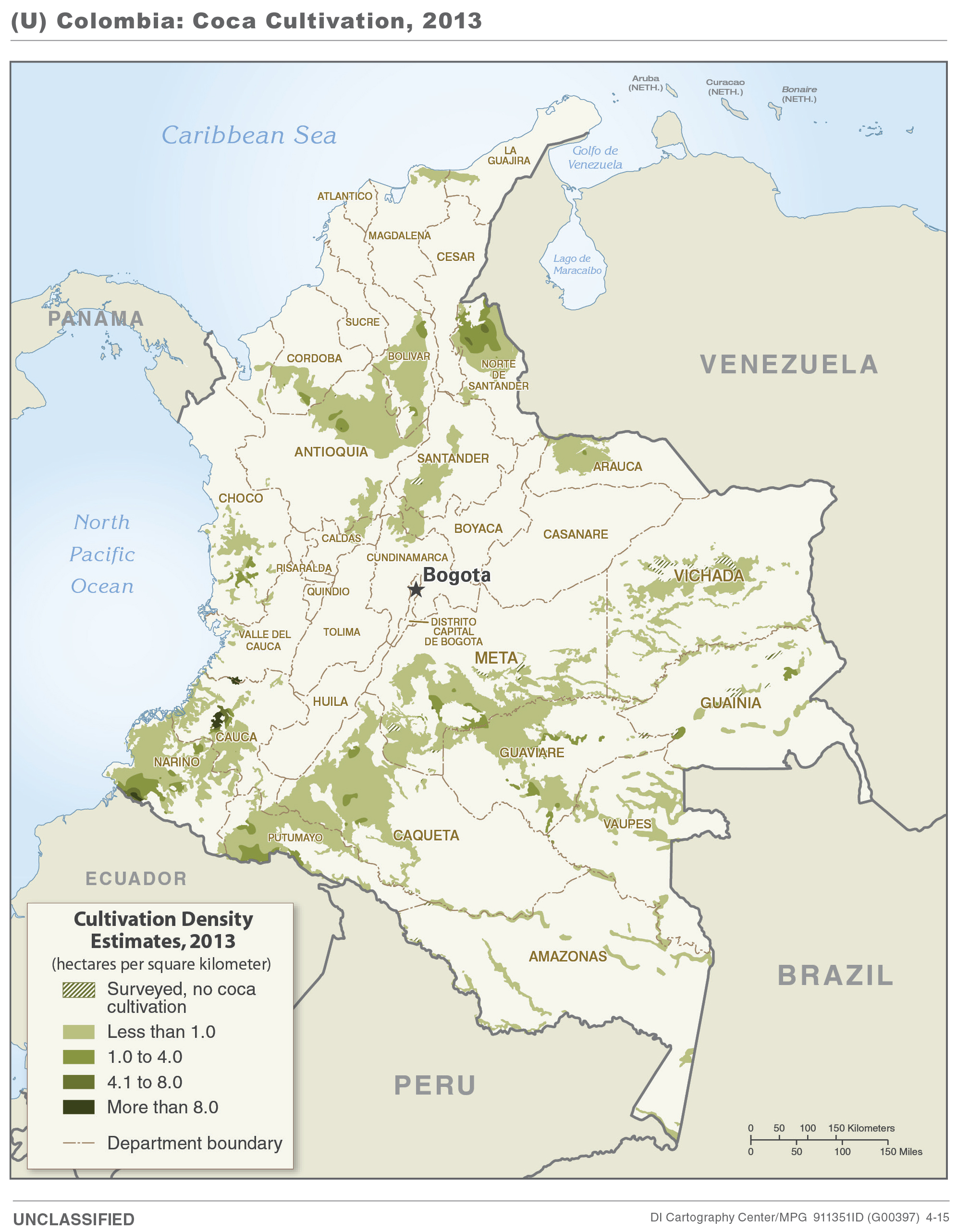
CIA map of coca cultivation in Colombia (2013)

In 2012, coca production in Colombia amounted to 0.2% of Colombia's overall GDP and 3% of Colombia's GDP related to the agricultural sector. The great majority of coca cultivation takes place in the departments of Putumayo, Caquetá, Meta, Guaviare, Nariño, Antioquia, and Vichada.

== History ==
Before the 1990s, harvesting coca leaves had been a relatively small-scale business in Colombia. Though Peru and Bolivia dominated coca-leaf production in the 1980s and early 1990s, manual-eradication campaigns there, the successful rupture of the air bridge that previously facilitated the illegal transport of Bolivian and Peruvian coca leaf to Colombia, and a fungus that wiped out a large percentage of Peru's coca crops made it more difficult for the cartels to obtain coca from these countries.

In response, Colombia's drug cartels purchased land in Colombia to expand local production, pushing coca cultivation into areas of southern Colombia controlled by the Revolutionary Armed Forces of Colombia (FARC). Colombia replaced Bolivia and Peru as the primary producer of coca leaf between 1996 and 1997, but fell back behind Peru again in 2012.

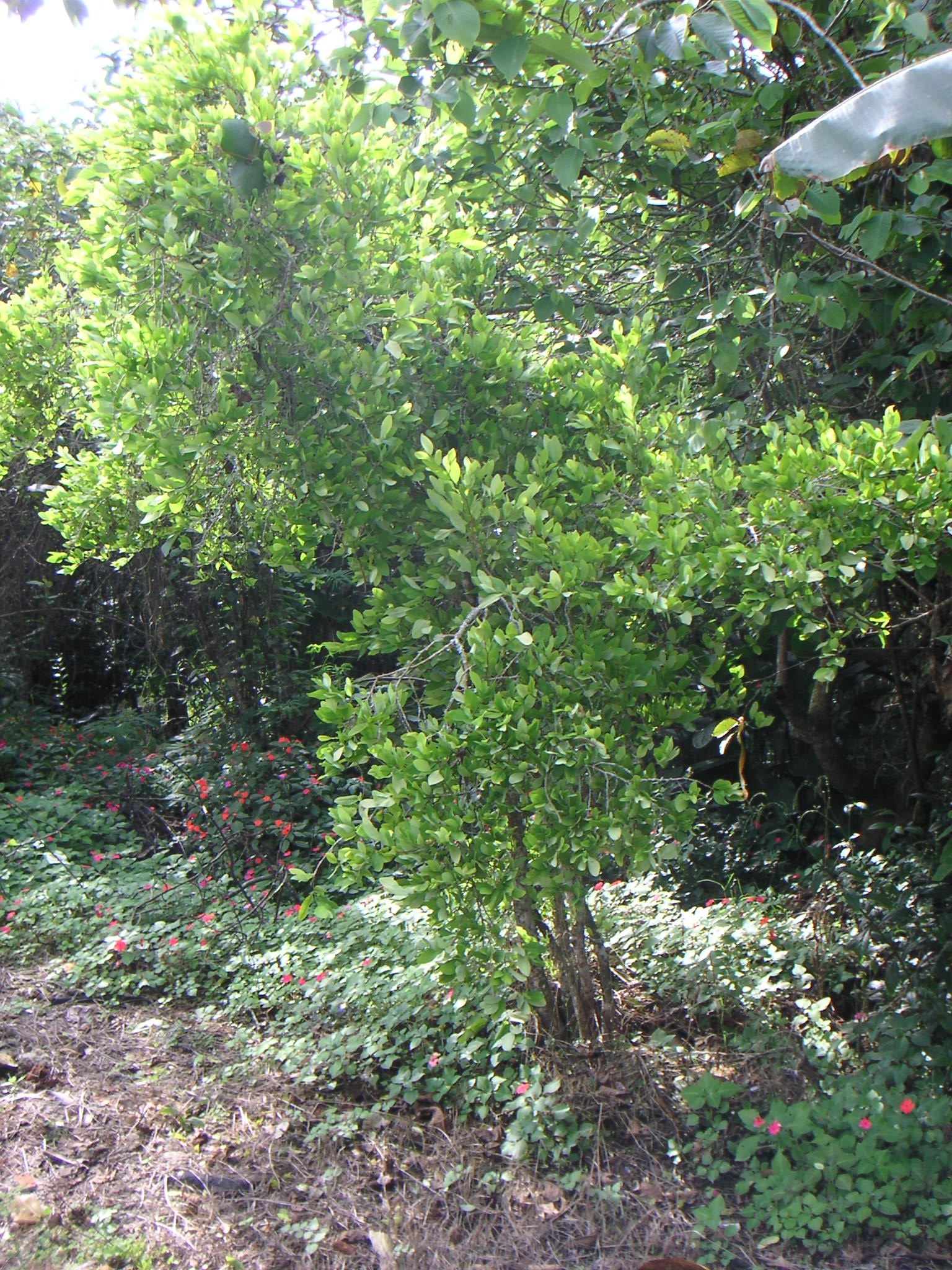
A Coca plant

With only 14 percent of the global coca-leaf market in 1991, by 2004 Colombia was responsible for 80 percent of the world's cocaine production. One estimate has Colombia's coca cultivation hectarage growing from 13,000 hectares (32,000 acres) in the mid-1980s, to 80,000 hectares (200,000 acres) in 1998, to 99,000 in 2007. The US Department of State estimated in its 2015 International Narcotics Control Strategy Report that the area devoted to coca cultivation remained relatively stable in 2013, increasing only three percent from 78,000 hectares (190,000 acres) in 2012 to 85,000 hectares (210,000 acres) in 2013, with an increase primarily in Norte de Santander, national parks, indigenous reserves, within a 10-kilometer zone along the border with Ecuador where aerial spraying is prohibited, and along the Pacific coast, and it was decreasing in the center of the country. As of September 2015, 2014 production and cultivation estimates were not available.

Another estimate has Colombia's coca cultivation area growing from 40,100 in 1990 to 163,300 in 2000, but dropping to 78,000 in 2007 as a result of government eradication programs. Overall, any decrease due to eradication has been tempered by an increase in productivity, as estimated coca production grew from 463 metric tons in 2001 to 610 metric tons in 2006. A 2017 UNODC report into the cultivation of illicit crops in Colombia showed that the number of hectares under coca cultivation leapt from 96,000 in 2015 to 146,000 in 2016.

As of 2006, coca production in Colombia employed an estimated 67,000 households. According to U.S. government reports, children are employed in the production of coca in Colombia.

== Coca eradication programs ==
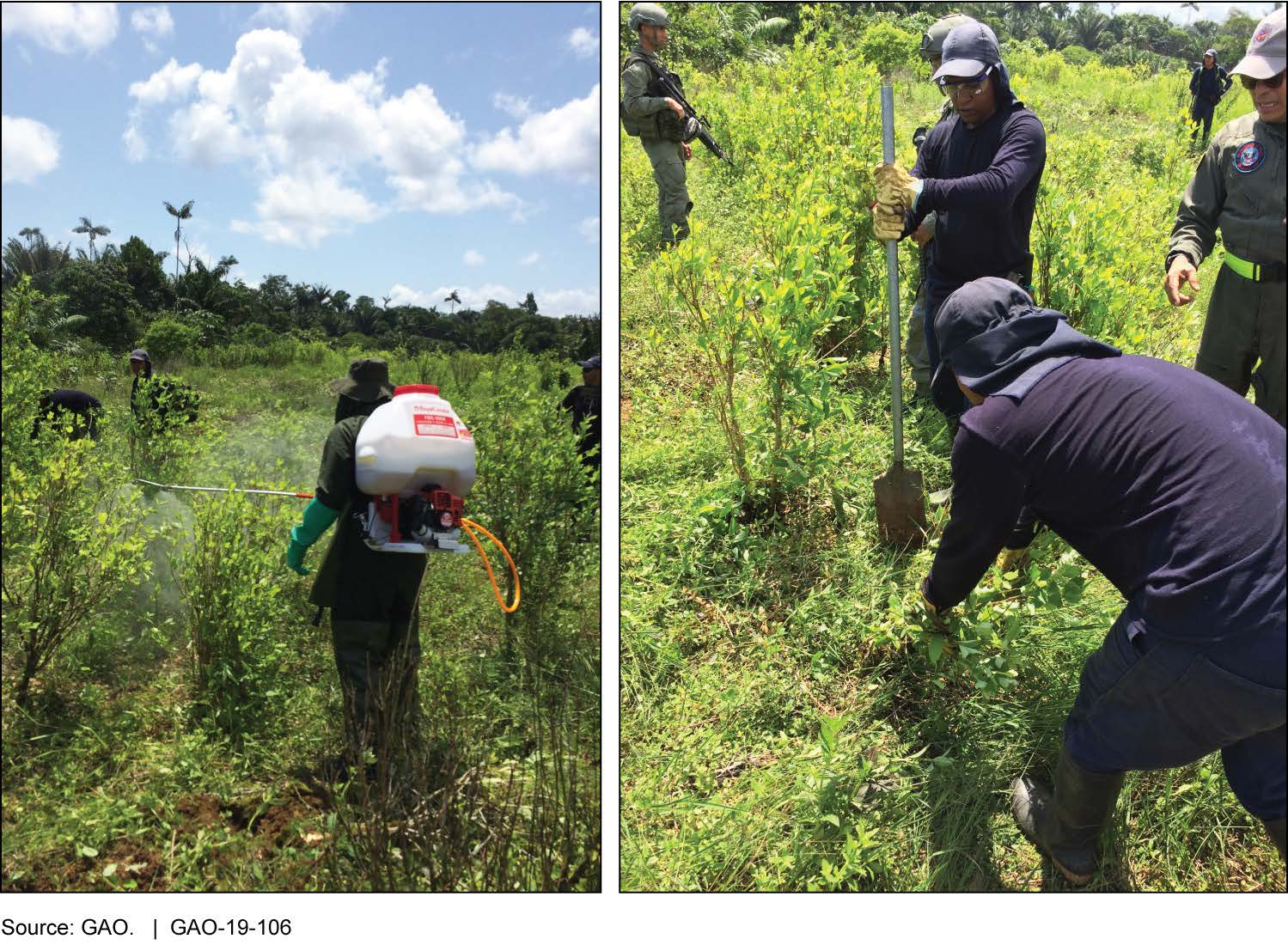
Coca eradication underway in Colombia

The Colombian government has programs to eradicate coca by mechanical means (burning or cutting) or with herbicides, such as glyphosate sprayed by airplanes and helicopters. In 2014, Colombia aerially eradicated 55,532 ha and manually eradicated 11,702 ha of coca in 2014, falling short of its goal of 14,000 ha. As obstacles to manual eradication the US Department of State listed local level protests blocking access roads to coca fields, and security concerns on the Ecuador-Colombia border and in the Catatumbo region near the Venezuela-Colombia border. Also, because of Colombia's national elections, 669 members of the Colombian national police’s primary interdiction force, the Anti-Narcotics Directorate's (DIRAN) Jungla commando force, and between 45,000 and 60,000 police officers during the three-month presidential campaign and voting period had been unavailable for manual coca eradication

The aerial spraying of glyphosate herbicide is one of the most controversial methods of coca eradication. It has taken place because of Colombia's willingness to cooperate with the US in the militarized eradication of coca after signing Plan Colombia in 2000. Colombia is the only country in the world that permits aerial-spraying of drug producing crops. In many cases the spraying is carried out by American contractors, such as DynCorp.

Colombia rejects threats of the United States of America after the threat to decertify the country as a partner in counter-narcotics efforts.

For more than 30 years Colombia has demonstrated its commitment – paying a very high cost in human lives – with overcoming the drug problem. This commitment stems from the profound conviction that the consumption, production and trafficking of drugs constitute a serious threat to the well-being and security of citizens. Colombia is undoubtedly the country that has fought the most drugs and with more successes on this front. No one has to threaten us to meet this challenge.

— Colombia’s National Government

The problem of drugs is global. Overcoming it can only be achieved through cooperation and under the principle of joint responsibility. Consumer countries’ authorities have a fundamental responsibility to their fellow citizens and the world to reduce consumption and to attack trafficking and distribution organizations in their own countries.

— Colombia’s National Government

== Eradication programmes in 2025/26 ==
In April 2025, the Colombian government under Gustavo Petro announced that they would be restarting the use of glyphosate to combat coca production with a new target of 30,000 hectares for 2025. This occurred following pressure from the United States to increase its coca eradication levels, or face the loss of its anti- drug certification, which would lose Colombia millions in funding, and possibly result in sanctions or tariffs. Washington's frustration stemmed from Colombia's poor levels of coca eradication, resulting from Gustavo's deviation from aerial fumigation in favour of crop substitution schemes instead. In 2024, for example, Colombia failed to meet its target of 10,000 hectares of coca crops destroyed.

Gustavo Petro campaigned on the platform of ending the use of glyphosate and was public about his disdain for the prohibition method, given the established data regarding its ineffectiveness in combating drug production and public health risks. His government was attempting to combat coca production through crop substitution, helping ensure farmers are able to make a decent income off of legal crops so that they don't have to resort to illegal ones.

However, in an attempt to retain certification, Petro made the decision to reinstate aerial fumigation. Despite this, Colombia was still decertified by the US in September 2025.

The US has faced criticism for its treatment of Colombia regarding this matter, as some experts have argued that they used their economic power and the threat of decertification to push Colombia into using fumigation, as headlines of huge quantities of hectares destroyed translate much better for voters. In contrast, methods like substitution are argued to be more effective at combating drug cultivation, but do not translate well into the political world or in mediaoutlet headlines.

Petro attempted to justify the effectiveness of his substitution schemes to Trump in their meeting on 4th February 2026, citing the moderation of cultivation levels the method has achieved. However, the meeting did not appear to shift Trump, or the administration's favourability of fumigation.

== Environmental effects ==
The Colombian landscape is damaged through the constant deforestation caused by clear cutting fields for coca cultivation and by coca eradication. Soil erosion and the chemical pollution caused by aerial spraying of glyphosate herbicide have negative effects on Colombia's environment and people.

Plots denuded of coca plants are abandoned and cause serious problems with erosion during seasonal rains. Because of the continuous high demand for coca, once a plot is destroyed, planters simply move further into the forest, clearing new lands for coca production. This vicious cycle of unsustainable cultivation-eradication has caused the environment in coca producing zones to suffer substantial decline.

Aerial spraying has been repeatedly condemned by human rights and environmental activists, because of its effect on human populations and local soil and water systems. In December 2000, Dutch journalist Marjon van Royen found that "because the chemical is sprayed in Colombia from planes on inhabited areas, there have been consistent health complaints [in humans]. Burning eyes, dizziness and respiratory problems being most frequently reported." In some areas, 80 percent of the children of the indigenous community fell sick with skin rashes, fever, diarrhoea and eye infections. Because the glyphosate is sprayed from the air, there is a much higher chance of human error when spraying suspected illegal coca plantations. In many cases the wrong fields are sprayed, resulting in not only a total loss of the farmer's crop, but the loss of that field altogether as nothing will grow, where the herbicide has been sprayed. Though official documentation of the health effects of glyphosate spraying in Colombia are virtually non-existent, neighbouring Ecuador has conducted studies to determine the cause of mysterious illnesses amongst people living along the border of Colombia and has since demanded that no aerial sprayings occur within 10 km of the border because of the damages caused to people, animals and environment in that area.
