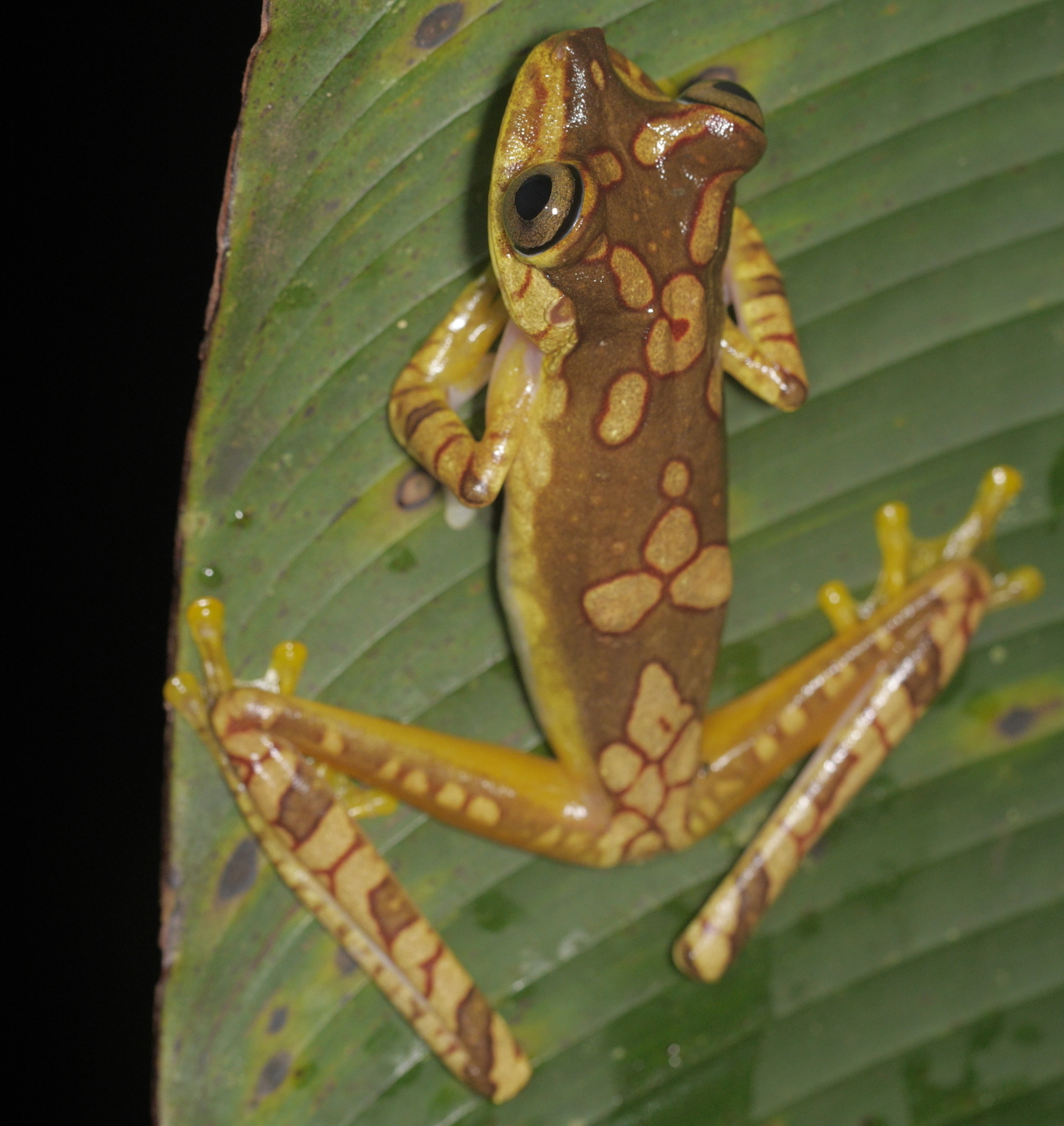

Conservation status
- Least Concern (IUCN 3.1)

Scientific classification
- Kingdom: Animalia
- Phylum: Chordata
- Class: Amphibia
- Order: Anura
- Family: Hylidae
- Genus: Boana
- Species: B. picturata

Binomial name
- Boana picturata (Boulenger, 1899)

Synonyms
- Hyla picturata Boulenger, 1899; Hypsiboas picturatus (Boulenger, 1899)

= Imbabura tree frog =

Species of amphibian

The Imbabura tree frog (Boana picturata) is a species of frog in the family Hylidae found in the Pacific lowlands of western Colombia (Antioquia, Valle del Cauca, Cauca, and Nariño Departments) and northwestern Ecuador (Imbabura, Esmeraldas, Manabí, Pichincha, Santo Domingo de los Tsáchilas, Los Ríos, and Cotopaxi Provinces) from the sea level to 1,000 m (3,300 ft) asl.

== Description ==
Males measure 46–53 mm (1.8–2.1 in) and females 62–69 mm (2.4–2.7 in) in snout–vent length. Eyes are extremely large with yellow iris. Snout is truncated. The skin on the back is smooth and belly is slightly granular. Dorsal colouration is variable but generally with a reddish-brown background with round yellow marks. Some individuals have dark brown back with brown markings.

== Habitat and conservation ==
Its natural habitats are humid tropical and premontane forests, including secondary forests with a closed canopy. It lives on vegetation close to streams.

It is an uncommon species. Threats to it likely include habitat loss from agricultural development (including illegal crops, logging, and human settlement) and pollution from spraying illegal crops.
