= Sandra Suárez =

Sandra Suárez Pérez is a Colombian politician. She directed Plan Colombia, joint venture with US military against Colombian cartels. In addition she formed part of the team for the presidential campaign of Álvaro Uribe. Between 2003 and 2006, she served as Minister of Environment, Housing and Territorial Development during the presidency of Álvaro Uribe after the resignation of minister Cecilia Rodríguez. She also did marketing for the cell phone company Occel.
