= Boliviana negra =

Form of coca that is purportedly resistant to the herbicide glyphosate

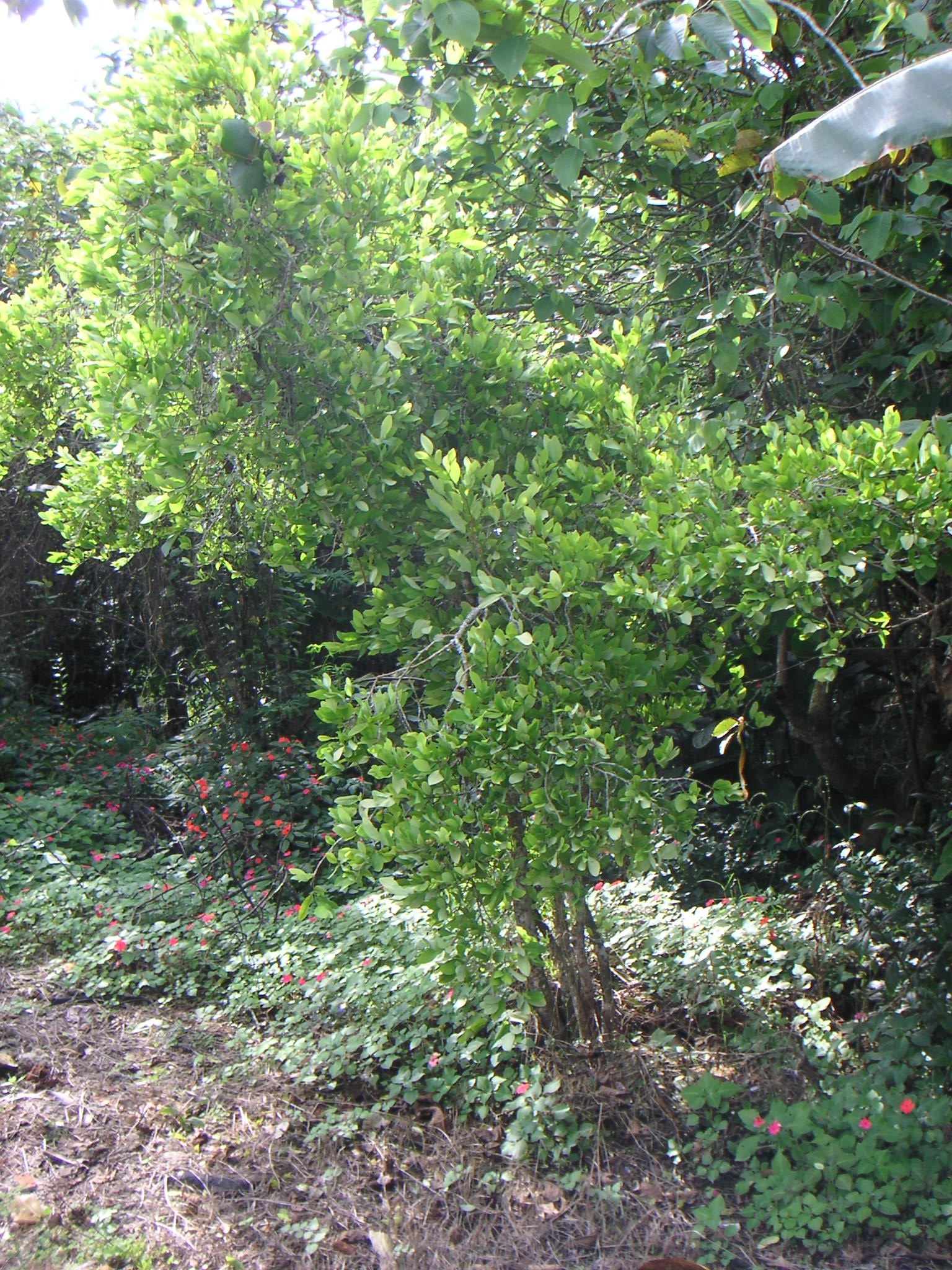
Normal coca tree in Colombia

Boliviana negra, also known as supercoca or la millionaria, is a form of coca (Erythroxylum coca) that is purportedly resistant to the herbicide glyphosate. The coca plant is the source of the potentially addictive stimulant cocaine, a prescription drug and one of the most widely consumed illegal drugs in the world and the source of large amounts of money to various criminal organizations. Glyphosate is a key ingredient in the multibillion-dollar aerial coca eradication campaign undertaken by the government of Colombia with U.S. financial and military backing known as Plan Colombia.

== Herbicide resistance ==
The herbicide resistance of this strain has at least two possible explanations: that a “peer-to-peer” network of coca farmers used selective breeding to enhance this trait through tireless effort, or the plant was genetically modified in a laboratory. In 1996, a patented Roundup Ready or glyphosate-resistant soybean was marketed by Monsanto Company, suggesting that it would be possible to genetically modify coca in an analogous manner. Spraying Boliviana Negra with glyphosate would serve to strengthen its growth by eliminating the non-resistant weeds surrounding it. Joshua Davis, in Wired, found no evidence of CP4 EPSPS, a protein produced by the Roundup Ready soybean, suggesting Bolivana Negra was not created in a laboratory but by selective breeding in the fields.

A fungal plant pathogen, Fusarium oxysporum, has been suggested as a possible successor to glyphosate, both similarly are hazards to humans and other plant species.

== See also ==
- Monsanto
- DynCorp
