= Marjon van Royen =

Dutch journalist and foreign correspondent

Marjon van Royen (born 24 October 1957 in The Hague) is a Dutch journalist and foreign correspondent for the NOS Journaal, the Dutch language public radio and television news channel.

She started her career as a freelance journalist in Italy in the 1980s. From 1991 to 2003 she worked for the daily newspaper NRC Handelsblad, covering national news and the Balkan Wars (March 1994 to late 1995). In her reporting from former Yugoslavia she refused to take sides, which was not always appreciated. Henk Hofland, the éminence grise of Dutch journalism, described her reports from Bosnia as very good: "That was reporting in the most direct way and written in an excellent manner."

In 1996 she became the correspondent for Latin America, based in Mexico, working for NRC Handelsblad and the NOS. In 1999, she moved to Rio de Janeiro (Brazil). She left NRC Handelsblad in 2003, but continued to work for NOS radio and television until January 2013.

In December 2000, she investigated the health impacts of aerial fumigations of coca cultivation in Colombia with the herbicide Roundup, which contains the active ingredient glyphosate. She found that "because the chemical is sprayed in Colombia from planes on inhabited areas, there have been consistent health complaints [in humans]. Burning eyes, dizziness and respiratory problems being most frequently reported." In some areas, 80 percent of the children of the indigenous community fell sick with skin rashes, fever, diarrhoea and eye infections.

In 1993 she published her first book Italië op maandag (Italy on a Monday), which sold over 50,000 copies. In 2004, she published De nacht van de schreeuw (The Night of the Scream) about the absorbing account of a friendship between two women of very different classes and cultures.
