= Coca eradication =

Drug regulation strategy

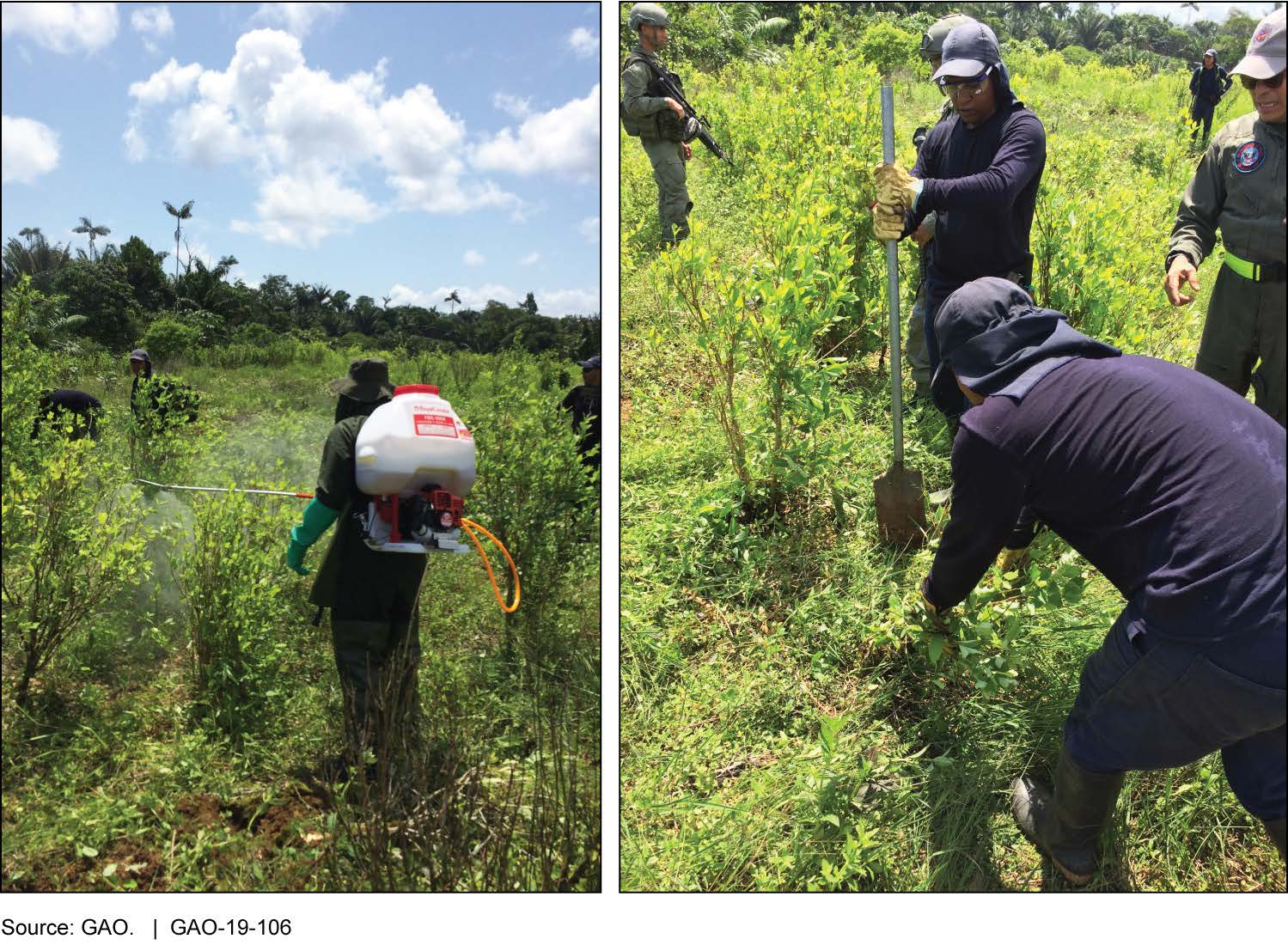
Eradication of coca production in Colombia

Coca eradication is a strategy promoted by local authorities in coca-producing countries, often with support from foreign partners such as the United States and the European Union, to eliminate the cultivation of coca—a plant whose leaves are used in the manufacture of cocaine. This approach, which gained momentum starting in 1961 as part of the U.S.-led "war on drugs," was adopted in place of running educational campaigns against drug usage. The prohibitionist strategy is being pursued in the coca-growing regions of Colombia (Plan Colombia), Peru, and formerly Bolivia, where it is highly controversial because of its environmental, health and socioeconomic impact. Indigenous cultures living in the Altiplano, such as the Aymaras, use the coca leaf (which they dub the "millenary leaf") in many of their cultural traditions, notably for its medicinal qualities in alleviating the feeling of hunger, fatigue and headaches symptomatic of altitude sicknesses. The growers of coca are named Cocaleros, and part of the coca production for traditional use is legal in Peru, Bolivia and Chile.

== Environmental impact ==
Plots denuded of coca plants by mechanical means (burning or cutting) or chemical herbicides, such as glyphosate, are abandoned and cause serious problems with erosion in seasonal rains. Because of the continuous high demand for coca, once a plot is destroyed the planters simply move further into the forest, clearing new lands for coca production. It is this cycle of unsustainable cultivation-eradication that has caused the environment in coca-producing zones to suffer substantial decline.

Aerial spraying of glyphosate herbicide, one of the most controversial methods of coca eradication, has taken place in Colombia exclusively because of that government's willingness to cooperate with the United States in the militarized eradication of coca after signing Plan Colombia in 2000. In many cases the spraying is carried out by American contractors, such as DynCorp, using planes and helicopters to spray glyphosate on coca plantations. Aerial spraying has been repeatedly condemned by human rights and environmental activists because of its effect on human populations and local soil and water systems. In December 2000, Dutch journalist Marjon van Royen found that "because the chemical is sprayed in Colombia from planes on inhabited areas, there have been consistent health complaints [in humans]. Burning eyes, dizziness and respiratory problems being most frequently reported." In some areas, 80 percent of the children of the indigenous community fell sick with skin rashes, fever, diarrhoea and eye infections. Because the glyphosate is sprayed from the air, there is a much higher chance of human error when spraying suspected illegal coca plantations. In many cases the wrong fields are sprayed, resulting in a loss of the farmer's crop as well as a loss of that field altogether as nothing will grow where the herbicide has been sprayed. Though official documentation of the health effects of glyphosate spraying in Colombia are virtually non-existent, neighbouring Ecuador has conducted studies to determine the cause of mysterious illnesses amongst people living along the border of Colombia and has since demanded that no aerial sprayings occur within 10 km of the border because of the damage caused to the people, animals and environment in that area. In 2015, Colombia announced a ban on using glyphosate in these programs due to concerns about human toxicity of the chemical.

In April 2025, the Colombian President Gustavo Petro announced that the country would be resuming the use of manual glyphosate spraying to combat high levels of coca cultivation within the country, despite the prior ban. This reimplementation ran counter to the fact that Petro had been very vocal with his disdain for the use of glyphosate throughout his presidential campaign and term, due to the damage it causes to local communities. The change came about due to US pressure on Colombia to ramp up levels of coca plant removal- in early 2025, the Trump administration had warned Petro that if Colombia didn't increase removal levels, it would lose its anti-drug certification.

In addition, the U.S. has been involved in the development of the fungus Fusarium oxysporum to wipe out coca. In 2000, the Congress of the United States approved use of Fusarium as a biological control agent to kill coca crops in Colombia (and another fungus to kill opium poppies in Afghanistan), but these plans were canceled by President Bill Clinton, who was concerned that the unilateral use of a biological agent would be perceived by the rest of the world as biological warfare. The Andean nations have since banned its use throughout the region. (The use of biological agents to kill crops may be illegal under the Biological Weapons Convention of 1975.)

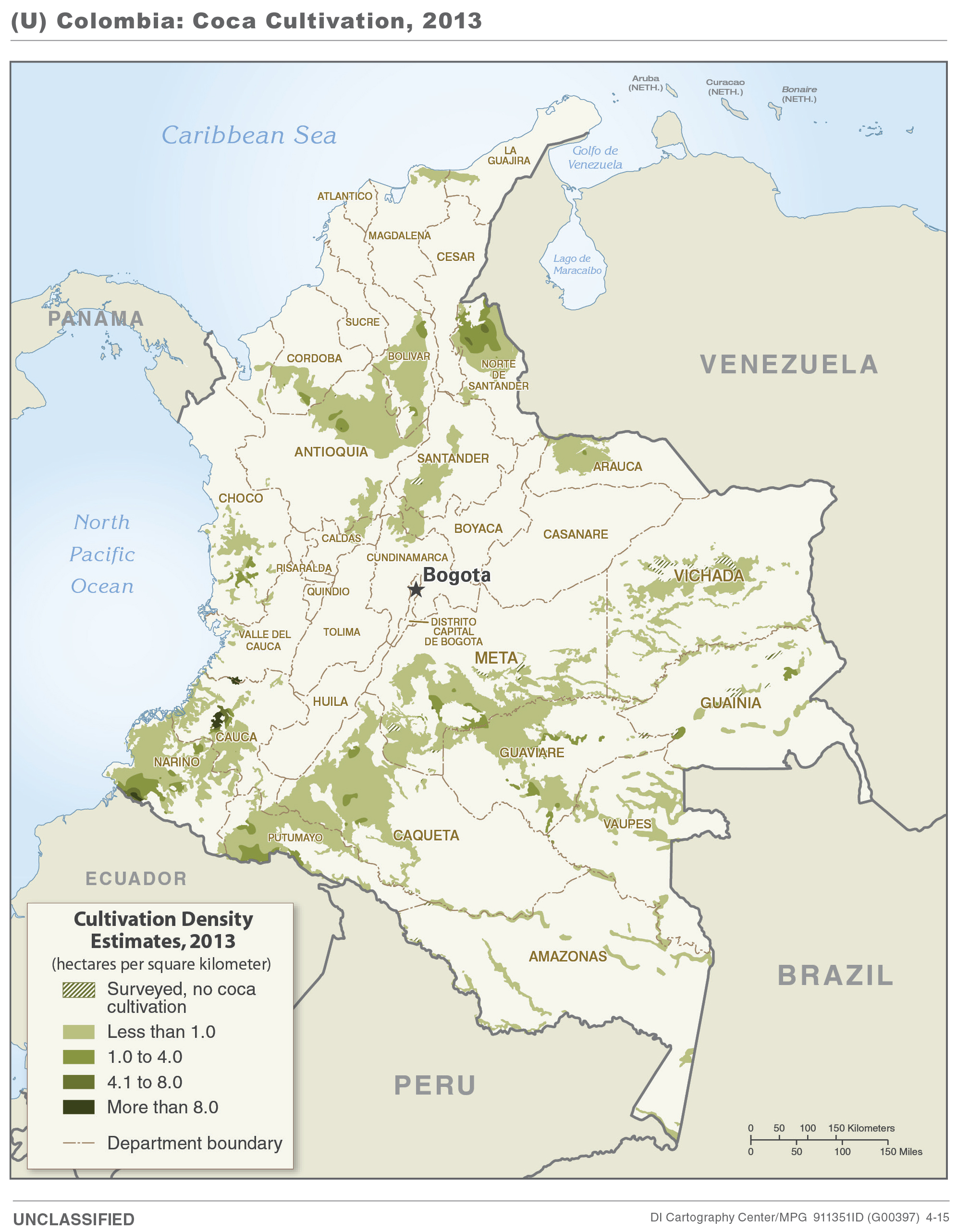
Source: DEA Intelligence Division, December 2013

On June 25, 2003, the Superior Administrative Court of the Colombian department of Cundinamarca ordered a stop to the spraying of glyphosate herbicides until the government complies with the environmental management plan for the eradication program. It also mandated a series of studies to protect public health and the environment. The Colombian State Council, the country's maximum administrative authority, later overruled the court's decision to stop fumigations.

Recently, Boliviana negra, a glyphosate-resistant type of coca plant has been found.

== Socioeconomic impact ==
In the sierra of Peru, Bolivia, and northern Argentina, coca has been consumed (by chewing and brewing in infusion) for thousands of years as a stimulant and cure for altitude sickness; it also has symbolic value. The sale and consumption of coca (but not pure cocaine) is legal in these countries.

With the growth of the Colombian drug cartels in the 1980s, coca leaf became a valuable agricultural commodity, particularly in Peru and Bolivia, where the quality of coca is higher than in Colombia. To supply the foreign markets, the cartels expanded the cultivation to areas where coca was not a traditional crop. Many poor campesinos, driven from the central highlands by lack of land or loss of jobs, migrated to the lowlands and valleys of the eastern Andes, where they turned to the cultivation of coca.

To counter this development, the U.S. government, through its foreign aid agency USAID, has promoted a policy of crop substitution, whereby coca cultivation is replaced by coffee, banana, pineapple, palm heart, and other crops suitable for a tropical climate. However; many remote coca-growing areas lack the infrastructure to get such perishable products to market on time. Coca on the other hand stores well and is easily transportable. The price of coca has remained high and in many cases remains a more attractive crop to farmers than these alternatives. Despite these obstacles, many farmers have embraced alternative crops. In 2006, Bolivia, as a result of alternative development programs, exported US$28 million of banana, US$1.9 million of pineapple, and US$7.0 million of palm heart. These industries now employ more than 20,000 people in the Chapare region.

== Geopolitical issues ==
Many critics of coca eradication believe the fundamental goal of the U.S. government is to constrict the flow of income to the Colombian Marxist rebel movement, FARC, which is heavily funded by the illegal drug trade, rather than combating drugs per se. Few if any such critics have anything favorable to say about the illicit drug trade, but they point out that under the current coca eradication policies, poor campesinos bear the brunt of efforts to combat it, while North American and European chemical companies (which supply chemicals needed in the manufacture of cocaine) and banks (which annually launder hundreds of billions of dollars in illegal revenues) continue to profit from the trade. (Although it is illegal in the United States for banks to hold funds from drug cartels—such as FARC—that have been designated as foreign terrorist organizations.)

Article 26 of the Single Convention on Narcotic Drugs, a treaty promulgated with U.S. backing in 1961, states "The Parties shall so far as possible enforce the uprooting of all coca bushes which grow wild. They shall destroy the coca bushes if illegally cultivated." The US-based Drug Enforcement Administration, along with local governments, has frequently clashed with cocaleros in attempts to eradicate coca across the Andes. Human rights NGOs such as Human Rights Watch have accused the US of human rights abuses in the "coca war".

Meanwhile, the US-based Stepan Company is authorized by the Federal Government to import and process the coca plant which it obtains from Peru and Bolivia. Besides producing the coca flavoring agent for Coca-Cola, Stepan Company extracts cocaine from the coca leaves, which it sells to Mallinckrodt, a pharmaceutical manufacturer that is the only company in the United States licensed to purify cocaine for medicinal use.

== Results ==
At the start of 2003, there were 1,740 km^{2} of coca in worldwide cultivation, and Colombia represented more than 60% of that total. Critics of the Colombian eradication program had predicted that it would lead to higher coca production in Peru and Bolivia. However, in November 2003, the US Office of National Drug Control Policy (ONDCP) claimed the area planted with coca in Peru and Bolivia combined fell by 35 km^{2} in the year up to June, which would suggest that the crop eradication program in neighboring Colombia had not driven production over the borders. According to ONDCP estimates, the area cultivated with coca in Bolivia rose from 244 km^{2} in 2002 to 284.5 km^{2} in June 2003, but this increase was more than offset in Peru, where the area fell from 366 km^{2} to 311.5 km^{2}.

The U.S. figures were very different from preliminary estimates in September 2003 by the head of the UN Office on Drugs and Crime in Colombia, which indicated that output in Peru and Bolivia may have risen that year. The White House office said its estimate was based on sampling from high resolution satellite imagery. The United Nations used a different technique and had not yet put out any formal estimate for 2003.

A March 2005 report by the ONDCP indicated that despite record aerial spraying of over 1,300 km^{2} of coca in Colombia in 2004, the total area under coca cultivation remained "statistically unchanged" at 1,140 km^{2}. In response to the report, the Washington Office on Latin America (WOLA), an NGO that monitors the impact of US foreign policy in Latin America, observed that the aerial spraying strategy appeared to have hit its limits. According to WOLA, the new ONDCP data suggested a continued "balloon effect" as aggressive spraying in some areas has not deterred new cultivation elsewhere. The WOLA Senior Associate for Drug Policy commented, "The stable cultivation in 2004 throws into doubt US officials’ predictions of a major impact on US drug prices and purity." Regardless, Colombian President Álvaro Uribe vowed to press ahead with the U.S.-financed fumigation of coca crops.

Official estimates of coca cultivation in Peru for 2005 have yet to be released, but the State Department's own reporting suggests that cultivation in Peru has increased. In Bolivia, there has been a decrease in clashes since 2004, when Evo Morales and former President Carlos Mesa struck a deal allowing the Chapare region to legally grow a limited amount of coca, in addition to the already legal Yungas region.

In 2006 the Colombian government destroyed around 730 square kilometres, reaching new records in coca plant destruction. The Colombian government planned to destroy around 500 km^{2} of coca plants in 2007, which would leave only around 200 km^{2} left. The Colombian government planned to destroy the remaining coca gradually over the following years.

== Quotes ==
The U.S. has supplied tens of thousands of gallons of Roundup to the Colombian government for use in aerial fumigation of coca crops. We have been using a fleet of crop dusters to dump unprecedented amounts of high-potency glyphosate over hundreds of thousands of acres in one of the most delicate and bio-diverse ecosystems in the world. This futile effort has done little to reduce the availability of cocaine on our streets, but now we are learning that a possible side-effect of this campaign could be the unleashing of a Fusarium epidemic in the Amazon basin. The drug war has tried in vain to keep cocaine out of people's noses, but could result instead in scorching the lungs of the earth.

— Sanho Tree, the director of the Institute for Policy Studies Drug Policy Project.

== See also ==
- Agent Orange
- Evo Morales, Bolivian president and former cocalero activist
