= Plan Colombia =

United States foreign aid, military and diplomatic initiative in Colombia

- Part of Colombian conflict
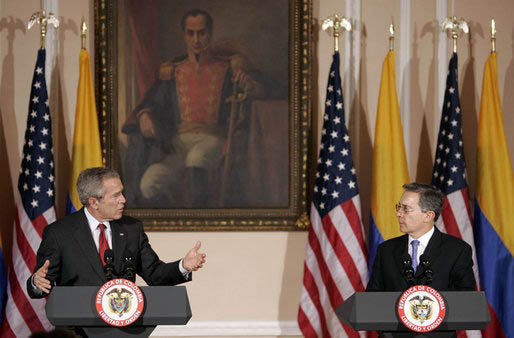
- U.S. President George W. Bush in Bogotá with Colombian President Álvaro Uribe
- Type: Government counternarcotics operation and political initiative
- Planned: 1999
- Planned by: United States under Bill Clinton and Colombia under Andrés Pastrana Arango
- Commanded by: United States Department of State & Defense under Clinton and Bush; Colombian government under Uribe and Arango
- Objective: End the Colombian conflict through strengthening Colombian security forces and combating coca production.
- Date: 2000-2015
- Executed by: US intelligence agencies and special forces, Colombian military and police
- Outcome: Reduction in cocaine trafficking by 72% from Colombia and was terminated and replaced with new plan after a series of negotiations led to peace agreement with FARC.

Plan Colombia was a United States foreign aid, military aid, and diplomatic initiative aimed at combating Colombian drug cartels and left-wing insurgent groups. The plan was originally conceived in 1999 by the administrations of Colombian President Andrés Pastrana Arango and U.S. President Bill Clinton, and signed into law in the United States in 2000.

The official objectives of Plan Colombia were to end the Colombian armed conflict by increasing funding and training of Colombian military and para-military forces and creating an anti-cocaine strategy to eradicate coca cultivation. Partly as a result of the plan, the FARC lost much of its power against the Colombian government. Sources conflict on its effects limiting cocaine production; however, US reports conclude that cocaine production in Colombia dropped 72% from 2001 to 2012, contradicting UN sources which found no change in cocaine production.

Plan Colombia in its initial form existed until 2015, with the United States and the Colombian government seeking a new strategy as a result of the peace talks between the Colombian government and the FARC. The new program is called "Peace Colombia" (Paz Colombia) and seeks to provide Colombia with aid after the implementation of the Peace Agreement in 2017 with the FARC.

== Original Plan Colombia ==
The original version of Plan Colombia was officially unveiled by President Andrés Pastrana in 1999. Pastrana had first proposed the idea of a possible "Marshall Plan for Colombia" during a speech at Bogotá's Tequendama Hotel on June 8, 1998, nearly a week after the first round of that year's presidential elections. Pastrana argued that:

[Drug crops are] a social problem whose solution must pass through the solution to the armed conflict...Developed countries should help us to implement some sort of 'Marshall Plan' for Colombia, which will allow us to develop great investments in the social field, in order to offer our peasants different alternatives to the illicit crops.

After Pastrana was inaugurated, one of the names given to the initiative at this early stage was "Plan for Colombia's Peace", which President Pastrana defined as "a set of alternative development projects which will channel the shared efforts of multilateral organizations and [foreign] governments towards Colombian society". Pastrana's Plan Colombia, as originally presented, did not focus on drug trafficking, military aid, or fumigation, but instead emphasized the manual eradication of drug crops as a better alternative. According to author Doug Stokes, one of the earlier versions of the plan called for an estimated 55 per cent military aid and 45 percent developmental aid.

During an August 3, 1998 meeting, President Pastrana and U.S. President Bill Clinton discussed the possibility of "securing an increase in U.S. aid for counternarcotics projects, sustainable economic development, the protection of human rights, humanitarian aid, stimulating private investment, and joining other donors and international financial institutions to promote Colombia's economic growth". Diplomatic contacts regarding this subject continued during the rest of the year and into 1999.

For President Pastrana, it became necessary to create an official document that specifically "served to convene important U.S. aid, as well as that of other countries and international organizations" by adequately addressing US concerns. The Colombian government also considered that it had to patch up a bilateral relationship that had heavily deteriorated during the previous administration of President Ernesto Samper (1994–1998). According to Pastrana, Under Secretary of State Thomas R. Pickering eventually suggested that, initially, the U.S. could be able to commit to providing aid over a three-year period, as opposed to continuing with separate yearly packages.

As a result of these contacts, US input was extensive, and meant that Plan Colombia's first formal draft was originally written in English, not Spanish, and a Spanish version was not available until "months after a revised English version was already in place". Critics and observers have referred to the differences between the earliest versions of Plan Colombia and later drafts. Originally, the focus was on achieving peace and ending violence, within the context of the ongoing peace talks that Pastrana's government was then holding with the FARC guerrillas, following the principle that the country's violence had "deep roots in the economic exclusion and...inequality and poverty".

The final version of Plan Colombia was seen as considerably different, since its main focuses would deal with drug trafficking and strengthening the military. When this final version was debated on the U.S. Senate floor, Joseph Biden spoke as a leading advocate of the more hardline strategy.

Ambassador Robert White stated:

If you read the original Plan Colombia, not the one that was written in Washington but the original Plan Colombia, there's no mention of military drives against the FARC rebels. Quite the contrary. (President Pastrana) says the FARC is part of the history of Colombia and a historical phenomenon, he says, and they must be treated as Colombians...[Colombians] come and ask for bread and you (America) give them stones.

In the final U.S. aid package, 78.12 percent of the funds for 2000 went to the Colombian military and police for counternarcotics and military operations. (See graph, below)

President Pastrana admitted that most of the resulting US aid to Colombia was overwhelmingly focused on the military and on counternarcotics (68%), but argued that this was only some 17% of the total amount of estimated Plan Colombia aid. The rest, focusing mostly on social development, would be provided by international organizations, Europe, Japan, Canada, Latin America, and Colombia itself. In light of this, Pastrana considered that the Plan had been unfairly labeled as "militarist" by national and international critics that focused only on the US contribution.

== Financing ==
U.S. Aid to Colombia, 1996–2006 (including non-Plan Colombia aid)
Last updated 11/11/05; In millions	1996	1997	1998	1999	2000	2001	2002	2003	2004	2005 (est)	2006 (req)
Military/Police	54.15	88.56	112.44	309.18	765.49	242.97	401.93	620.98	555.07	641.60	641.15
Economic/Social	0.62	0.00	0.52	8.75	214.31	5.65	120.30	136.70	134.98	131.29	138.52
% Military	99.88	100	99.53	97.42	78.12	97.72	76.96	81.95	80.43	83.01	

This original plan called for a budget of US$7.5 billion, with 51% dedicated to institutional and social development, 32% for fighting the drug trade, 16% for economic and social revitalization, and 0.8% to support the then on-going effort to negotiate a political solution to the state's conflict with insurgent guerrilla groups. Pastrana initially pledged US$4.864 billion of Colombian resources (65% of the total) and called on the international community to provide the remaining US$2.636 billion (35%). Most of this funding was earmarked for training and equipping new Colombian army counternarcotics battalions, providing them with helicopters, transport and intelligence assistance, and supplies for coca eradication.

In 2000, the Clinton administration in the United States supported the initiative by committing $1.3 billion in foreign aid and up to five hundred military personnel to train local forces. An additional three hundred civilian personnel were allowed to assist in the eradication of coca. This aid was an addition to US$330 million of previously approved US aid to Colombia. US$818 million was earmarked for 2000, with US$256 million for 2001. These appropriations for the plan made Colombia the third largest recipient of foreign aid from the United States at the time, behind only Israel and Egypt. Under President George W. Bush, aid to Colombia earmarked for military aid vs. humanitarian aid became more balanced. Ultimately, the U.S. would provide approximately US$10 billion under Plan Colombia through 2015.

Colombia sought additional support from the European Union and other countries, with the intention of financing the mostly social component of the original plan. Some would-be donors were reluctant to cooperate, as they considered that the US-approved aid represented an undue military slant, and additionally lacked the will to spend such amounts of money for what they considered an uncertain initiative.

Initially, some of these countries donated approximately US$128.6 million (in one year), which was 2.3% of the resulting total. Larger amounts, in some instances up to several hundred million dollars, were also donated to Colombia and continued to be provided either directly or through loans and access to credit lines, but technically fell outside the framework of Plan Colombia. "European countries provide economic and social development funds but do not consider them to be in support of Plan Colombia." In any case, the sums raised fell well short of what was originally called for. In addition, Colombia's eventual contribution was less than planned due in part to a 1999–2001 economic crisis.

== War on drugs ==
In the United States, Plan Colombia is seen as part of the "war on drugs", which was started under President Richard Nixon in 1971. Plan Colombia has numerous supporters in the United States Congress. Congressional supporters assert that over 1,300 square kilometers of mature coca were sprayed and eradicated in Colombia in 2003, which would have prevented the production of over 500 metric tons of cocaine, stating that it eliminated upward of $100 million of the illicit income that supports drug dealers and different illegal organizations considered terrorist in Colombia, the U.S. and the European Union.

According to a 2006 U.S. congressional report on U.S. enterprises that had signed contracts to carry out anti-narcotics activities as part of Plan Colombia, DynCorp, the largest private company involved, was among those contracted by the State Department, while others signed contracts with the Defense Department.

== Expansion under Bush ==
As enacted in 2000, Plan Colombia called for two U.S. supported actions in Colombia. The first was to cause the “eradication, interdiction, and alternative development” of coca fields which are used to produce cocaine—which in turn provided most of the funding for the FARC. And second, to offer social and economic assistance to the rural areas that the FARC have controlled for half a century.

A third more security oriented countermeasure—to provide enhanced intelligence, training and supplies to Colombian armed forces against the FARC—took greater importance post 9/11 under the Andean Regional Initiative, as the threat of global terrorism received increased attention. The Andean Regional Initiative initially appropriated $676 million to South American countries, with approximately $380 million targeted at Colombia. The 2001 initiative reduced the limitations on the numbers and the activities of civilian contractors, allowing them to carry and use military weapons which, according to the U.S. government, would be necessary to ensure the safety of personnel and equipment during spray missions. The United States Congress rejected amendments to the Andean initiative that would have redirected some of the money to demand reduction programs in the United States, primarily through funding of drug treatment services. Some critics have opposed the rejection of these modifications, claiming that the drug problem and its multiple repercussions would be structurally addressed by curbing the demand, and not the production, of illicit drugs, since drug crops can always be regrown and transplanted elsewhere, inside or outside Colombia and its neighboring countries, as long as there is a commercially viable market.

In 2004, the United States appropriated approximately $727 million for the Andean Counterdrug Initiative, $463 million of which was targeted at Colombia.

In October 2004, the compromise version of two U.S. House–Senate bills was approved, increasing the number of U.S. military advisors that operate in the country as part of Plan Colombia to 800 (from 400) and that of private contractors to 600 (from 400).

In a November 22, 2004 visit to Cartagena, President Bush stood by Colombian president Uribe's security policies and declared his support for continuing to provide Plan Colombia aid in the future. Bush claimed the initiative enjoys "wide bipartisan support" in the US and in the coming year he would ask Congress to renew its support.

Taken together then, the three countermeasures represent what President George W. Bush referred to as his “three-legged stool” strategy of “waging a global war on terror, supporting democracy and reducing the flow of illicit drugs into the United States.” Although Plan Colombia includes components which address social aid and institutional reform, the initiative has come to be regarded by its critics as fundamentally a program of counternarcotics and military aid for the Colombian government.

== Criticism ==
=== Research studies ===
The US Defense Department funded a two-year study which found that the use of the armed forces to interdict drugs coming into the United States would have minimal or no effect on cocaine traffic and might, in fact, raise the profits of cocaine cartels and manufacturers. The 175-page study, "Sealing the Borders: The Effects of Increased Military Participation in Drug Interdiction," was prepared by seven economists, mathematicians and researchers at the National Defense Research Institute, a branch of the RAND Corporation and released in 1988. The study noted that seven previous studies in the past nine years, including ones by the Center for Naval Research and the Office of Technology Assessment, had come to similar conclusions. Interdiction efforts, using current armed forces resources, would have almost no effect on cocaine importation into the United States, the report concluded.

During the early to mid-1990s, the Clinton administration ordered and funded a major cocaine policy study again by RAND. The Rand Drug Policy Research Center study concluded that $3 billion should be switched from federal and local law enforcement to treatment. The report said that treatment is the cheapest way to cut drug use. President Clinton's Director of National Drug Control Policy rejected slashing law enforcement spending.

Plan Colombia itself didn't exist at the time of the second RAND study, but the U.S. aid package has been criticized as a manifestation of the predominant law enforcement approach to the drug trade as a whole.

=== Guerrillas and oil ===
Attacks on Oil Pipelines, 2001–2004
	2001	2002	2003	2004
All pipelines	263	74	179	103
Caño Limón–Coveñas	170	41	34	17
Source: Ministry of Defense, Government of Colombia.

Critics of Plan Colombia, such as authors Doug Stokes and Francisco Ramirez Cuellar, argue that the main intent of the program is not drug eradication but to fight leftist guerrillas. They argue that these Colombian peasants are also a target because they are calling for social reform and hindering international plans to exploit Colombia's valuable resources, including oil and other natural resources. As of 2004, Colombia is the fifteenth largest supplier of oil to the United States and could potentially rise in that ranking if petroleum extraction could be conducted in a more secure environment. From 1986 to 1997 there were nearly 79 million barrels (12,600,000 m^{3}) of crude oil spilled in pipeline attacks. Damage and lost revenue were estimated at $1.5 billion, while the oil spills seriously damaged the ecology.

While the assistance is defined as counternarcotics assistance, critics such as filmmaker Gerard Ungeman argues it will be used primarily against the FARC. Supporters of the Plan such as the U.S. embassy in Bogotá and U.S. Under Secretary of State for Political Affairs Marc Grossman argue that the distinction between guerrillas, paramilitaries and drug dealers may have increasingly become irrelevant, seeing as they could be considered as part of the same productive chain. As a result, counternarcotics assistance and equipment should also be available for use against any of these irregular armed groups when necessary.

=== Human rights conditions ===
In June 2000, Amnesty International issued a press release in which it criticized the implemented Plan Colombia initiative:

Plan Colombia is based on a drug-focused analysis of the roots of the conflict and the human rights crisis which completely ignores the Colombian state's own historical and current responsibility. It also ignores deep-rooted causes of the conflict and the human rights crisis. The Plan proposes a principally military strategy (in the US component of Plan Colombia) to tackle illicit drug cultivation and trafficking through substantial military assistance to the Colombian armed forces and police. Social development and humanitarian assistance programs included in the Plan cannot disguise its essentially military character. Furthermore, it is apparent that Plan Colombia is not the result of a genuine process of consultation either with the national and international non-governmental organizations which are expected to implement the projects nor with the beneficiaries of the humanitarian, human rights or social development projects. As a consequence, the human rights component of Plan Colombia is seriously flawed.

During the late 1990s, Colombia was the leading recipient of US military aid in the Western Hemisphere, and due to its continuing internal conflict has the worst human rights record, with the majority of atrocities attributed (from most directly responsible to least directly responsible) to paramilitary forces, insurgent guerrilla groups and elements within the police and armed forces.

A United Nations study reported that elements within the Colombian security forces, which have been strengthened due to Plan Colombia and U.S. aid, do continue to maintain intimate relationships with right-wing death squads, help organize paramilitary forces, and either participate in abuses and massacres directly or, as it is usually argued to be more often the case, deliberately fail to take action to prevent them. One of the larger examples of this behavior was the 2008 False Positives Scandal, in which the Colombian military murdered approximately 1,400 innocent civilians in order to make false claims that these cadavers were Farc soldiers.

Critics of the Plan and of other initiatives to aid Colombian armed forces point to these continuing accusations of serious abuse, and argue that the Colombian state and military should sever any persisting relationship with these illegal forces and need to prosecute past offenses by paramilitary forces or its own personnel. Supporters of the Plan assert that the number and scale of abuses directly attributable to the government's forces have been slowly but increasingly reduced.

Some paramilitary commanders openly expressed their support for Plan Colombia. In May 2000, paramilitary commander "Yair" from the Putumayo Southern Bloc, himself a former Colombian special forces sergeant, said that the AUC supported the plan and he offered to assist U.S.-trained counternarcotics battalions in their operations against the FARC in the coca-growing Putumayo department. Paramilitaries and FARC fought it out in the region one month before a Plan Colombia mandated military offensive began later that year. AUC fighters would have passed through checkpoints manned by the army's 24th Brigade in the area during the fighting.

==== SOA and human rights ====
According to Grace Livingstone, more Colombian School of the Americas (SOA) graduates have been implicated in human rights abuses than SOA graduates from any other country. All of the commanders of the brigades highlighted in the 2001 Human Rights Watch report were graduates of the SOA, including the III brigade in Valle del Cauca, where the 2001 Alto Naya Massacre occurred. US-trained officers have been accused of being directly or indirectly involved in many atrocities during the 1990s, including the Massacre of Trujillo and the 1997 Mapiripán Massacre.

In addition, Livingstone also argues that the Colombian paramilitaries employ counter insurgency methods that US military schools and manuals have been teaching Latin American officers in Colombia and in the region at large since the 1960s, and that these manuals teach students to target civilian supporters of the guerrillas, because without such support the guerrillas cannot survive.

The Pastrana administration replied to critics by stating that it had publicly denounced military-paramilitary links, as well as increased efforts against paramilitaries and acted against questionable military personnel. President Pastrana argues that he implemented new training courses on human rights and on international law for military and police officers, as well as new reforms to limit the jurisdiction of military courts in cases of grave human rights abuses such as torture, genocide or forced disappearances.

Pastrana claims that some 1300 paramilitaries were killed, captured or surrendered during his term, and that hundreds of members of the armed forces, including up to a hundred officers, were dismissed due to the existence of what it considered as sufficient allegations of involvement in abuses or suspected paramilitary activities, in use of a new presidential discretional faculty. These would include some 388 discharges in 2000 and a further 70 in 2001. Human Rights Watch recognized these events, but questioned the fact that the reasons for such discharges were not always made clear nor followed by formal prosecutions, and claimed that Pastrana's administration cut funds for the Attorney General's Human Rights Unit.

==== Leahy Law ====
In 1997 the US Congress approved an Amendment to the Foreign Operations Appropriations Act which banned the US from giving anti-narcotics aid to any foreign military unit whose members have violated human rights. The Amendment was called the "Leahy Provision" or "Leahy Law" (named after Senator Patrick Leahy who proposed it). Partially due to this measure and the reasoning behind it, anti-narcotics aid was initially only provided to Police units, and not to the military during much of the 1990s.

According to author Grace Livingstone and other critics, the problem is there have been very few military units free of members that have not been implicated in any kind of human rights abuses at all, so they consider that the policy has been usually ignored, downplayed or occasionally implemented in a patchy way. In 2000, Human Rights Watch, together with several Colombian human rights investigators, published a study in which it concluded that half of Colombia's eighteen brigade-level army units had extensive links to paramilitaries at the time, citing numerous cases which directly or indirectly implicated army personnel.

The State Department certified that Colombia would have complied with one of the human rights conditions (Sec. 3201) attached to Plan Colombia aid, due to President Pastrana's directing "in writing that Colombian Armed Forces personnel who are credibly alleged to have committed gross violations of human rights will be brought to justice in Colombia's civilian courts...". In August 2000 President Clinton used his presidential waiver to override the remaining human rights conditions, on the grounds that it was necessary for the interests of U.S. national security. Livingstone argues that if the US government funds military units guilty of human rights abuses, it is acting illegally.

=== Aerial eradication strategy ===
Aerial eradication, also referred to as fumigation, was implemented as a part of Plan Colombia, strongly supported by the United States government, as a strategy to eliminate drug crops in Colombia starting in the 1980s. By the mid-1990s, drug cultivation had increased and Colombia supplied up to 90% of the world's cocaine, which intensified aerial eradication efforts. United States policymakers advocated for the extensive use of the herbicide Roundup Ultra created by Monsanto for large-scale aerial spraying of illicit crops in Colombia.

Between 2000 and 2003, the aerial eradication program sprayed over 380,000 hectares of coca, accounting for more than 8% of Colombia's cultivatable land. This program was led by the Colombian Antinarcotics Directorate (DIRAN), police units responsible for the oversight of aerial spraying operations. By 2003, the program included twenty-four aircraft devoted to eradication with the addition of armed helicopters providing security against ground fire from armed groups including FARC and other organizations active in drug cultivation locals.

==== Criticism ====
The practice of forced eradication of illicit crops through aerial spraying has been criticized for its effectiveness in reducing the drug supply as well as having negative social and environmental impacts. According to the Transnational Institute, "the fact that an increasing crop area is being eradicated – much more was sprayed in 2003 than in 2002 – should be interpreted not as a sign of the policy's success, but as a sign of its failure, because it indicates that more and more land is being planted in these crops." According to Joshua Davis of Wired.com, the area has seen the emergence of a Roundup resistant variety of the coca plant known as "Boliviana Negra" that is not talked about because it might "put an end to American aid money", depicting the ecological adaptation resulting from this operation.

The aerial eradication strategy in Colombia has been a highly controversial approach in the nation's efforts to combat coca cultivation and the subsequent illicit drug trade. The strategies implementation of herbicides, specifically glyphosate, through aerial aircraft spraying was targeted towards coca crops, the raw material for cocaine production. The effectiveness and consequences have been a subject of large debate. In 2004, according to Robert Charles, assistant secretary of state for the INL, aerial eradication efforts were getting close to the point that continued suppression of the drug crops would convince growers that continued cultivation will be futile. Despite this perspective, statistics show that sharp reductions in growing caused by fumigation in 2002–2003 did not reduce cultivation levels back to their numbers in 1998, and on top of that, Colombia still remains the largest coca-growing country in the world.

Another reason to remain skeptical of the success of this program is the "balloon effect", where when one part of an industry is pressured it will be resolved in another area. In the context of aerial eradication, when drug cultivation was halted in one area, it would simply appear in another area, which would in turn reverse the intended effects of fumigation. As a result, coca farming has spread throughout Colombia, and the Colombian government even reported that between 1999 and 2002, the number of provinces where coca was being grown rose from twelve to twenty-two. The United Nations Office on Drugs and Crime (UNODC) also presented research on coca cultivation in Colombia which showed this crop's high degree of mobility and its increases of cultivation in ten provinces. For example, in the province Guaviare, coca cultivation moved south toward Caquetá and Putumayo as a result of aerial eradication in the 1990s, and thus cultivation rose 55 percent. Another issue raised by aerial eradication is rights violations as aerial eradication destroys one of the few economic options for a number of peasants and causes forced displacement because peasants have to find a new place to grow their crops.

One notable aspect in discussion of the aerial spraying of illicit crops in Colombia is the size of the areas sprayed. In Putumayo alone, forty thousand hectares are said to have been sprayed in a single department. On a national scale in 2003, chemicals were sprayed on 139,000 hectares, contributing to the displacement of approximately 17,000 people. The displacements led to threats of local livelihoods and food insecurity.

The broader implications of aerial eradication efforts have been recorded by Colombia's Council for Human Rights and Displacement, which reported between 2001 and 2002, aerial eradication displaced 75,000 people nationwide. The use of glyphosate, a potent herbicide, sparked concerns about its effects on human health and the environment. The scale of the operation suggests that there must be modification to the landscape which has consequences doe flora and fauna in the affected regions. The long-term effects on the residents of the sprayed areas are a matter of growing study and concern. These studies bring up the multifaceted nature of Plan Colombia, specifically aerial spraying in human and environmental health.

In addition to the previous criticisms, spraying has been associated with significant health concerns among residents in the affected areas. Reports have indicated that individuals living in these areas have a range of health issues including skin reactions, respiratory problems, and other ailments. This has sparked controversy with the United States due to the U.S. government's downplaying of the severity of the health risks. The officials had argued that illnesses arise as a result of the herbicides used by local farmers for individual crop control and cultivation rather than the aerial spraying operations.

To further the divide, the EPA provided the State Department with the assessments of health and environmental impacts of aerial eradication, however these assessments were conducted without specific testing measures of the local Colombian environment. The State Department did not provide sufficient evidence to the EPA on the delivery and mechanics of the spraying operations. In terms of environmental effects, because of the "balloon effect", farmers moved their crop cultivation into forests and national parks, resulting in, deforestation, pollution of soil, pollution of waterways, and even increased risk of extinction for Colombian bird and plant species. Aside from these specific issues, there are also others raised about the costs of fumigation and if it is utilizing too much of the budgetary spending.

This intensive program to eradicate crops with aerial spraying is the backbone of the bilateral anti-drug partnership between Colombia and United States making this program integral to both nations interactions.

==== Proposed use of mycoherbicides ====
In 1999, the U.S. Congress added a provision to its Plan Colombia aid package that called for the employment of mycoherbicides against coca and opium crops. The potential use of Fusarium oxysporum as part of these efforts was questioned and opposed by environmentalists. Colombia rejected the proposal and the Clinton administration waived the provision in light of continued criticism.

== Military programs ==
Compared to the counternarcotics measures, the military campaign waged against the FARC and other paramilitaries appears to have achieved more success. Military aid packages that were both part of, and separate from, Plan Colombia have successfully driven the FARC out of most of their former territory and targeted the leaders of the insurgency, killing over two dozen of them. The U.S. has largely remained in a non-combatant role, providing real time intelligence, training, and military equipment.

As the Colombian military (with U.S. support) continues to crack down on the FARC during the mid-2000s, the insurgency was sapped of much of their military might. Traditionally, the FARC has operated with a centralized, hierarchical command structure and a governing body called the Secretariat. With the deaths in 2008 of main leader Manuel Marulanda and second-in-command Raúl Reyes, followed by the killing of top tacticians Mono Jojoy and Alfonso Cano in 2010 and 2011, the group became increasingly disjointed. In 2001, for example, the FARC had over 18,000 fighters, but that figure fell to under 7,000 by 2014 mainly as a result of fighters abandoning the cause. In terms of land, the FARC once controlled a DMZ the size of Switzerland in 1999 and had encircled the capital of Bogota, yet they were subsequently pushed back to the southern highlands of the country and into the surrounding borders of Ecuador and Bolivia. As a result, FARC attacks in Colombia have declined significantly. Bombings on Occidental Petroleum's Caño Limón pipeline—a frequent target of the FARC—for instance, reached 178 separate incidents in 2001 compared to just 57 in 2007.

Even as the FARC have lost power and subsequently signed a peace agreement, there is concern about what will happen to the remnants of the group. One fear is that autonomous fronts will forge their own relationships with the cartels and continue the drug trade in a more dispersed manner.

As of 2008 Plan Colombia's U.S.-funded military programs comprised:

- Army Aviation Brigade (2000–2008 cost: $844 million)
  - This program is executed by the U.S. State and Defense departments. It equips and trains the helicopter units of the Colombian Army. It is subdivided into various specific programs.
    - Plan Colombia Helicopter Program (PCHP) comprises helicopters provided for free by the U.S. government to the Colombian Army. The program needs 43 contract pilots and 87 contract mechanics to operate.
      - 17 Bell UH-1N helicopters (Former Canadian aircraft bought via US gov )
      - 22 Bell UH-1H (Huey II) helicopters
      - 13 Sikorsky UH-60L helicopters
    - Foreign Military Sales (FMS) helicopters are purchased by the Colombian Army but supported by U.S. personnel.
      - 20 Sikorsky UH-60L helicopters
    - Technical Assistance Field Team
      - Based at Tolemaida Air Base (Melgar, Tolima), the team provides maintenance to U.S.-made helicopters.
    - Joint Initial Entry Rotary Wing School
      - Based at Melgar Air Base (Melgar, Tolima), it is a flight school for Colombian combat-helicopter pilots. Additional pilot training is provided at the U.S. Army's helicopter training center (Fort Rucker, Alabama)
- National Police Air Service (2000–2008 cost: $463 million)
  - The U.S. State Department supports approximately 90 aircraft operated by the Colombian National Police. The U.S. Defense Department supports the construction of an aviation depot at Madrid Air Base (Madrid, Cundinamarca).
- National Police Eradication Program (2000–2008 cost: $458 million)
  - This program is executed by a private company, DynCorp, under the supervision of the U.S. State Department's Bureau of International Narcotics and Law Enforcement Affairs (INL), and operates out of Patrick Space Force Base in Florida. U.S. State Department-owned planes spray chemicals to destroy coca and opium poppy crops in rural Colombia. From 2000 to 2008, more than 1 million hectares (2.5 million acres) of crops were destroyed.
    - 13 Air Tractor AT-802 armored crop dusters
    - 13 Bell UH-1N helicopters
    - 4 Alenia C-27 cargo planes
- National Police Interdiction Efforts (2000–2008 cost: $153 million)
  - The U.S. State Department equips and trains a Colombian National Police unit known as Junglas. The unit's 500 members are divided into three companies based in Bogotá, Santa Marta, and Tuluá.
- Infrastructure Security Strategy (2000–2008 cost: $115 million)
  - This program secures part of the Cano Limon-Covenas Pipeline, benefiting international oil company Occidental Petroleum. Its air component has 2 Sikorsky UH-60 and 8 Bell UH-1H (Huey II) helicopters. Its ground component includes U.S. Special Forces training and equipment for 1,600 Colombian Army soldiers.
- Army Ground Forces (2000–2008 cost: $104 million)
  - Joint Task Force Omega
    - It was established to operate in the central departments of Meta, Guaviare, and Caquetá. U.S. military advisors provided planning and intelligence support. The U.S. also provided weapons, ammunition, vehicles, and a base in La Macarena, Meta. It has about 10,000 soldiers.
  - Counternarcotics Brigade
    - It was established to operate in the southern departments of Putumayo and Caquetá. The U.S. Defense Department provided training and built bases in Tres Esquinas and Larandia, Caquetá. The U.S. State Department provided weapons, ammunition, and training. It has about 2,300 soldiers.
  - Joint Special Forces Command
    - It was established to pursue wanted individuals and rescue hostages. The U.S. provided training, weapons, ammunition, and a base near Bogotá. It has about 2,000 soldiers.
- Police Presence in Conflict Zones (2000–2008 cost: $92 million)
  - This program aims to establish government presence in all Colombian municipalities. Fifteen percent of Colombian municipalities had no police presence in 2002. Today all municipalities are covered, but in many of them government presence is limited to a small number of policemen. The program organized 68 squadrons of Carabineros, of 120 policemen each. The U.S. Department of State provides training, weapons, ammunition, night-vision goggles, and other equipment.
- Coastal and River Interdiction (2000–2008 cost: $89 million)
  - This program gave the Colombian Navy and Marines water vessels and aircraft to patrol the country's coast and rivers. The Navy received 8 interceptor boats and 2 Cessna Grand Caravan transport planes. The Marines received 95 patrol boats. The U.S. also provided both services with weapons, fuel, communications gear, night-vision goggles, and other equipment.
- Air Interdiction (2000–2008 cost: $62 million)
  - The U.S. State and Defense departments provided the Colombian Air Force with 7 surveillance planes and their maintenance support. The program also operates five radars inside Colombia, other radars outside the country, and airborne radars. The program is also known as the Air Bridge Denial Program.
- Another $2 billion were allocated from 2000 to 2008 to other programs including the Critical Flight Safety Program to extend the life of the U.S. State Department's fleet of aircraft, additional counternarcotics funding and aviation support for battlefield medical evacuations.

== Nonmilitary programs ==
Plan Colombia's drug eradication strategy centered on aerial fumigation operations operated from three strategic airfields: Tumaco – La Florida Airport in Nariño Department, Larandia Air Base in Caquetá Department, and Jorge Enrique González Torres Airport in San José del Guaviare, Guaviare Department. The latter airfield, situated in one of Colombia's heaviest coca-producing regions, served as a critical logistics and fueling point supporting helicopter escorts and surveillance aircraft. The operations utilized Air Tractor AT-802 aircraft with 800-gallon capacity to deliver glyphosate-based herbicides to coca plantations identified through sophisticated intelligence gathering that combined satellite imagery, Synthetic Aperture Radar (SAR), and multispectral imaging. These aircraft, operating under Colombian National Police registration were flown by civilian contractors from DynCorp with flying operation run by a former British navy decorated combat pilot Stephen Harrison-Thomas, were highly vulnerable to ground fire from guerrillas, cartels, and hostile farmers despite protective escorts from UH-60 Blackhawk and UH-1 Huey helicopters As of 2008, the U.S. has provided nearly $1.3 billion to Colombia through Plan Colombia's nonmilitary aid programs:

- Alternative Development (2000–2008 cost: $500 million)
- Internally Displaced Persons (2000–2008 cost: $247 million)
- Demobilization and Reintegration (2000–2008 cost: $44 million)
- Democracy and Human Rights (2000–2008 cost: $158 million)
- Promote the Rule of Law (2000–2008 cost: $238 million)

== Results ==
	1999	2000	2001	2002	2003	2004	2006	2007 (estimated)
Herbicide fumigation (sq. kilometers); Table one from U.S. government pdf file	432	473	842	1,226	1,328	1,365	x	x
Coca left over (sq. kilometers); Table two from U.S. government pdf file	1,225	1,362	1,698	1,444	1,138	1,140	x	x
Total coca cultivation (Herbicide fumigation + Coca left over)	1,657	1,835	2,540	2,671	2,466	2,505	860	360

=== U.S. 2005 estimate ===
On April 14, 2006, the U.S. Drug Czar's office announced that its Colombian coca cultivation estimate for 2005 was significantly greater than that of any year since 2002. The press release from the U.S. Office of National Drug Control Policy stated that "coca cultivation declined by 8 percent, from 114,100 to 105,400 hectares, when those areas surveyed by the US government in 2004 were compared with the same areas in 2005". However, "the survey also found 144,000 hectares of coca under cultivation in 2005 in a search area that was 81 percent larger than that used in 2004...newly imaged areas show about 39,000 additional hectares of coca. Because these areas were not previously surveyed, it is impossible to determine for how long they have been under coca cultivation."

Critics of Plan Colombia and of ongoing fumigation programs considered this new information as a sign of the failure of current U.S. drug policy. The Center for International Policy stated that "even if we accept the U.S. government's argument that the high 2005 estimate owes to measurement in new areas, it is impossible to claim that Plan Colombia has brought a 50 percent reduction in coca-growing in six years...Either Colombia has returned to [the 2002] level of cultivation, or the 'reductions' reported in 2002 and 2003 were false due to poor measurement."

=== UN 2005 estimate ===
On June 20, 2006, the United Nations (UN) Office on Drugs and Crime (UNODC) presented its own survey on Andean coca cultivation, reporting a smaller increase of about 8% and confirming a rising trend shown by the earlier U.S. findings. UN surveys employ a different methodology and are part of the ongoing "Illicit Crop Monitoring Program" (ICMP) and its "Integrated Illicit Crop Monitoring System" (SIMCI) project. The UNODC press release stated that during 2005 the "area under coca cultivation in Colombia rose by 6,000 hectares to 86,000 after four consecutive years of decline despite the continued efforts of the Government to eradicate coca crops". This represents a small increase above the lowest figure recorded by UNODC's surveys, which was 80,000 hectares in 2004. For UNODC, current cultivation remained "still well below the peak of 163,300 hectares recorded in 2000", as "significant reductions [...] have been made in the past five years and overall figures remain nearly a third below their peak of 2000".

UNODC concluded that "substantial international assistance" is needed by Colombia and the other Andean countries "so they can provide poor coca farmers with sustainable alternative livelihoods" and that "aid efforts need to be multiplied at least tenfold in order to reach all impoverished farmers who need support".

=== Analysis ===
The results of Plan Colombia have been mixed. From the perspective of the U.S. and Colombian governments, the results of Plan Colombia have been positive. U.S. government statistics show that a significant reduction in leftover coca (total cultivation minus eradicated coca) has been observed from peak 2001 levels of 1,698 square kilometers to an estimated 1,140 square kilometers in 2004. It is said that a record high aerial herbicide fumigation campaign of 1,366 square kilometers in 2004 has reduced the total area of surviving coca, even as newer areas are planted. Despite this, effective reductions may appear to have reached their limits as in 2004, despite a record high aerial herbicide fumigation campaign of 1,366 square kilometers, the total area of surviving coca has remained constant, as an estimated 1,139 square kilometers in 2003 were followed by about 1,140 square kilometers in 2004.

Additionally, recent poppy seed cultivation has decreased while coca cultivation actually has not. Overall attempted coca cultivation by growers (total planted coca without taking eradication into account) increased somewhat, from 2,467 square kilometers in 2003 to 2,506 square kilometers in 2004. Coca cultivation reached its highest point during the program in 2002 at 2,671 square kilometers.

The U.S. and Colombian governments interpret this data to show a decline in potential production of cocaine, from a peak of 700 metric tons in 2001 to 460 in 2003 and 430 in 2004, as result of an increase in "newly planted [coca fields] in response to eradication," which should be less productive than mature coca.

U.S. government officials admitted in late 2005 that the market price of cocaine has yet to rise significantly, as would be expected from the above reductions in supply. They pointed to possible hidden stashes and other methods of circumventing the immediate effect of eradication efforts which allow for a relatively constant flow of drugs able to enter into the market, delaying the consequences of drug eradication. U.S. Drug Czar John Walters stated that "the reason for [reductions in supply not immediately driving prices up] is that you are not seizing and consuming coca leaves that were grown in 2004 in 2004. You are seizing and consuming coca leaves that were probably grown and processed in 2003 and 2002."

Other observers say this points to the ultimate ineffectiveness of the Plan in stopping the flow of drugs and addressing more important or underlying issues like providing a viable alternative for landless and other peasants, who turn to coca cultivation due to a lack of other economic possibilities, in addition to having to deal with the tumultuous civil conflict between the state, guerrillas and paramilitaries. They also say that by making coca difficult to grow and transport in one area will lead to the movement of the drug cultivation processes to other areas, both inside and outside Colombia, a consequence also known as the balloon effect.

As an example of the above, it is claimed by critics that Peru and Bolivia, as countries which had earlier monopolized coca cultivations until local eradication efforts later led to the eventual transfer of that part of the illegal business to Colombia, have recently had small increases in coca production despite record eradication in Colombia, which some years ago accounted for about 80% of the coca base produced in South America. Supporters of the Plan and of drug prohibition in general consider that the increase has, so far, been significant to be a sign of the above "balloon effect".

The Colombian government announced that it eradicated around 73,000 coca hectares during 2006 which, according to it, would be above all local records in coca plant destruction. The Colombian government said that it plans to destroy an additional 50,000 hectares of coca in 2007.

The Weekly Standard hailed Colombia as "the most successful nation-building exercise by the United States in this century", noting:

Colombia used to be the world capital of kidnappings, but the number of victims is down from 2,882 in 2002 to 376 in 2008. Terrorist acts in the same period have fallen from 1,645 to 303. Homicides are also down dramatically: from 28,837 in 2002 to 13,632 in 2008, a 52 percent reduction. Three hundred fifty-nine Colombian soldiers and police lost their lives in battle in 2008, down from 684 in 2002. Between 2002 and 2008, the total hectares of cocaine eradicated rose from 133,127 to 229,227; tons of cocaine seized rose from 105.1 to 245.5; and the number of drug labs seized rose from 1,448 to 3,667. All statistics on narcotics production are hard to gather and therefore suspect, but the latest indications are that last year cocaine production in Colombia fell by 40 percent. Although Colombia's GDP grew by only 2.4 percent in 2008 as a result of the worldwide slowdown, it grew almost 8 percent in 2007, up from less than 2 percent in 2002. Unemployment is still high at 11.1 percent, but considerably lower than in 2002 when it was 15.7 percent.

== See also ==
- Colombia–United States relations
- Leahy Law
- Mérida Initiative
- United States and South and Central America
- Drug Enforcement Administration
- Agent Orange
- Sandra Suárez
