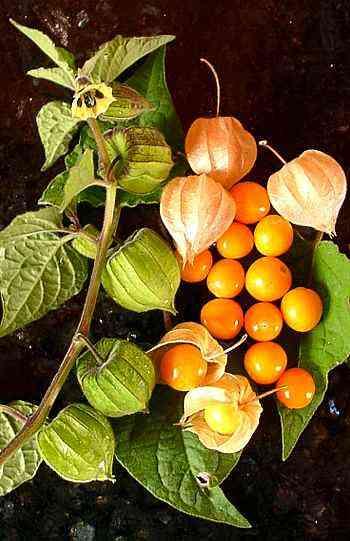
- Ripe orange fruits

Scientific classification
- Kingdom: Plantae
- Clade: Tracheophytes
- Clade: Angiosperms
- Clade: Eudicots
- Clade: Asterids
- Order: Solanales
- Family: Solanaceae
- Genus: Physalis
- Species: P. peruviana

Binomial name
- Physalis peruviana L.

Synonyms
- Boberella peruviana (L.) E.H.L. Krause; Herschelia edulis (Sims) Bowdich; Physalis edulis Sims; Physalis incana Desf.; Physalis incana Dunal; Physalis latifolia Lam.; Physalis tomentosa Medik.; Physalis tuberosa Cav

= Physalis peruviana =

Species of cultivated South American fruit

Physalis peruviana is a South American species of plant in the nightshade family (Solanaceae). Within its native range, it is called aguaymanto, uvilla or uchuva, in addition to numerous indigenous and regional names. In English, its common names include Cape gooseberry, goldenberry, physalis and Peruvian groundcherry.

The history of P. peruviana cultivation in South America can be traced to the Inca Empire. It has been cultivated in England since the late 18th century, and in South Africa since at least the start of the 19th century. Widely introduced in the 20th century, it is now cultivated or grows wild across the world in temperate and tropical regions.

== Description ==
P. peruviana is an annual in temperate locations, but a perennial in the tropics. As a perennial, it develops into a diffusely branched shrub reaching 1–1.6 metres (3 1/2–5 feet) in height, with spreading branches and velvety, heart-shaped leaves. The hermaphrodite flowers are bell-shaped and drooping, 15–20 millimetres (5/8–3/4 inch) across, and yellow with purple-brown internal spots. After the flower falls, the calyx expands, ultimately forming a beige husk fully enclosing the fruit.

The inflated, papery calyx is a prominent feature. The calyx is accrescent until the fruit is fully grown; at first, it is of normal size, but after the petals fall, it continues to grow until it forms a protective cover around the growing fruit. If the fruit is left inside the intact calyx husks, its shelf life at room temperature is about 30–45 days. The calyx is inedible.

The fruit is a round, smooth berry, resembling a miniature yellow tomato 1.25–2 centimetres (1/2–3/4 in) wide. Removed from its calyx, it is bright yellow to orange in color, and sweet when ripe, with a characteristic, mildly tart grape-like flavor.

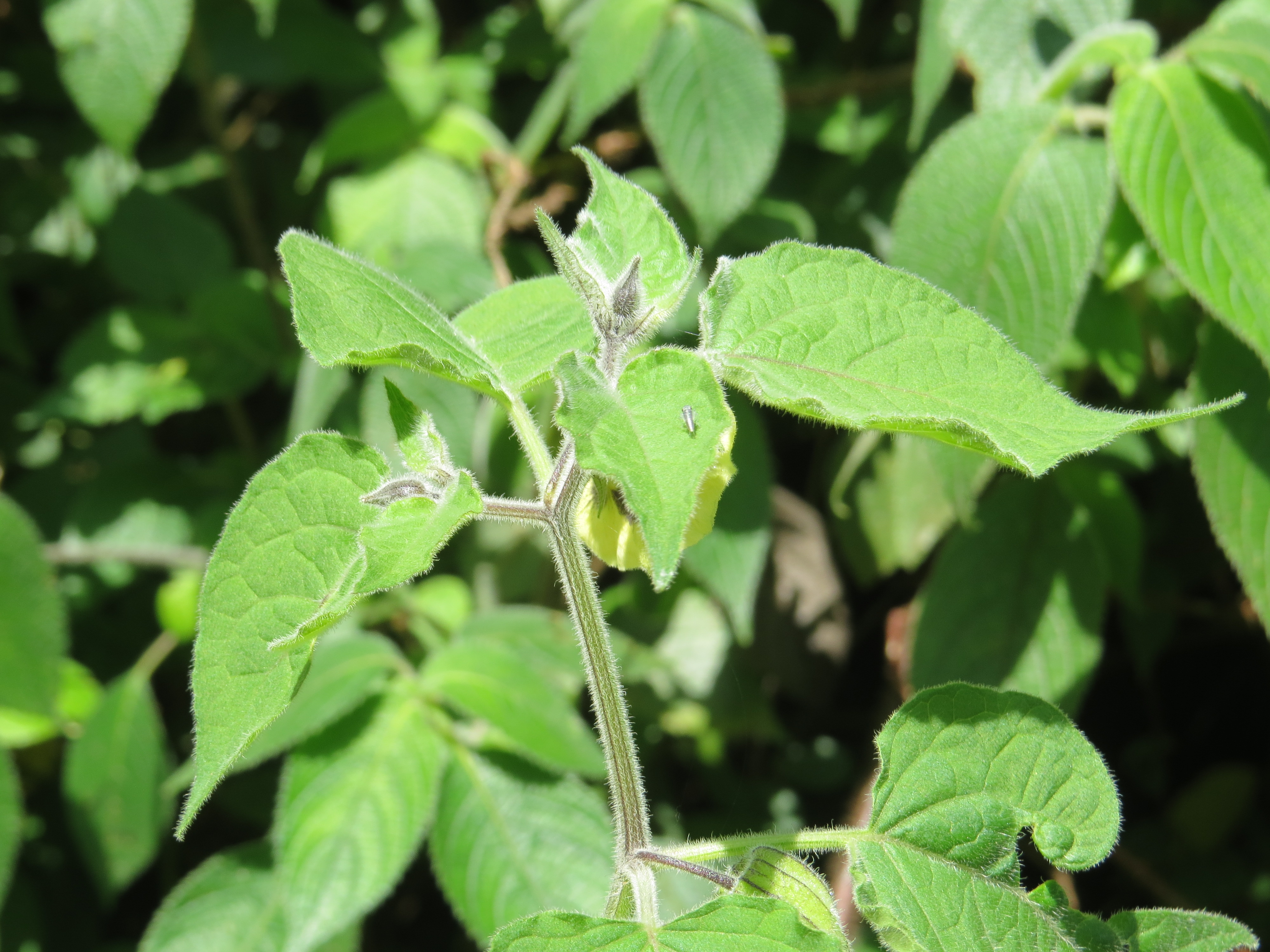
Hairy foliage

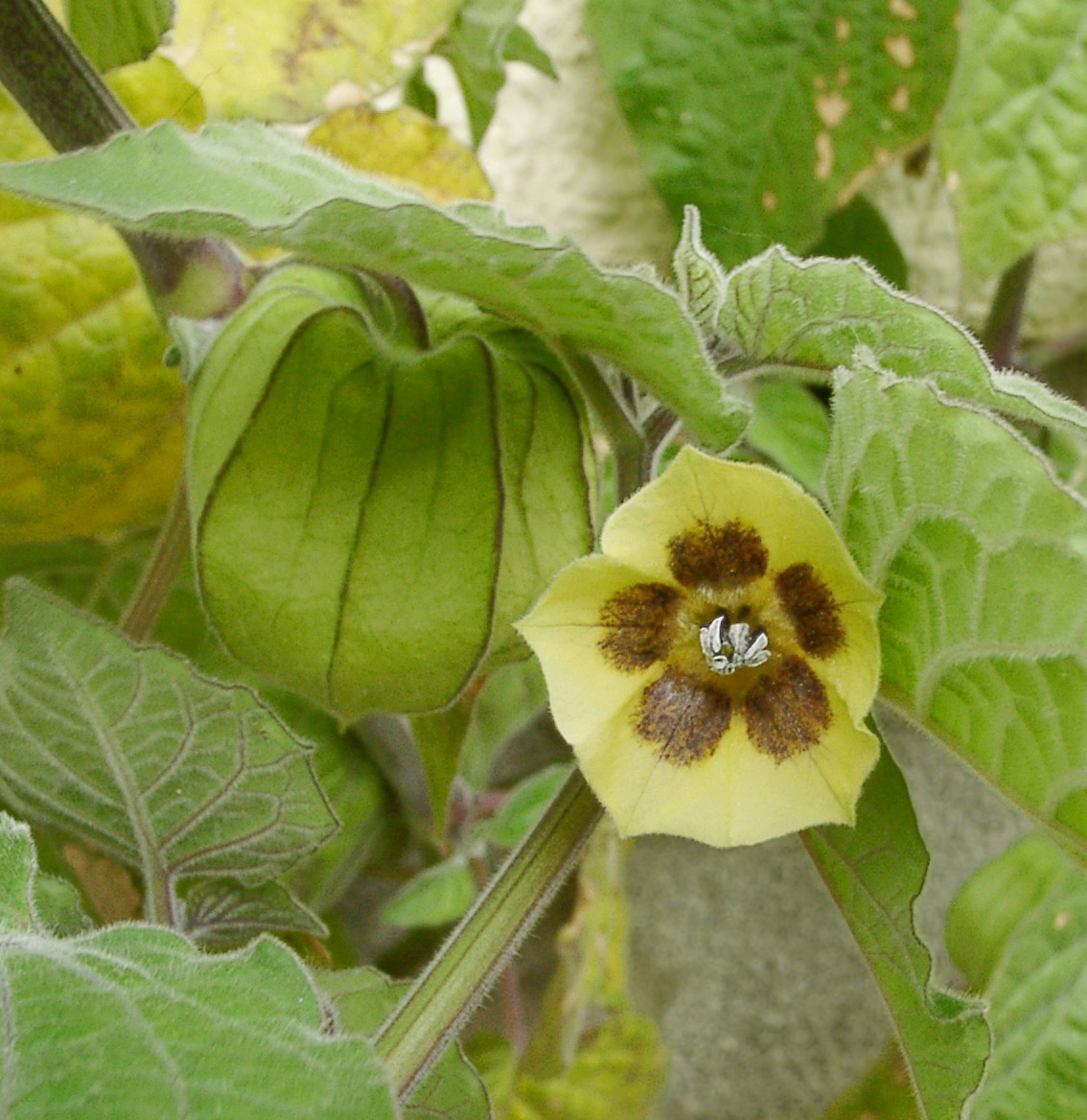
Flowering

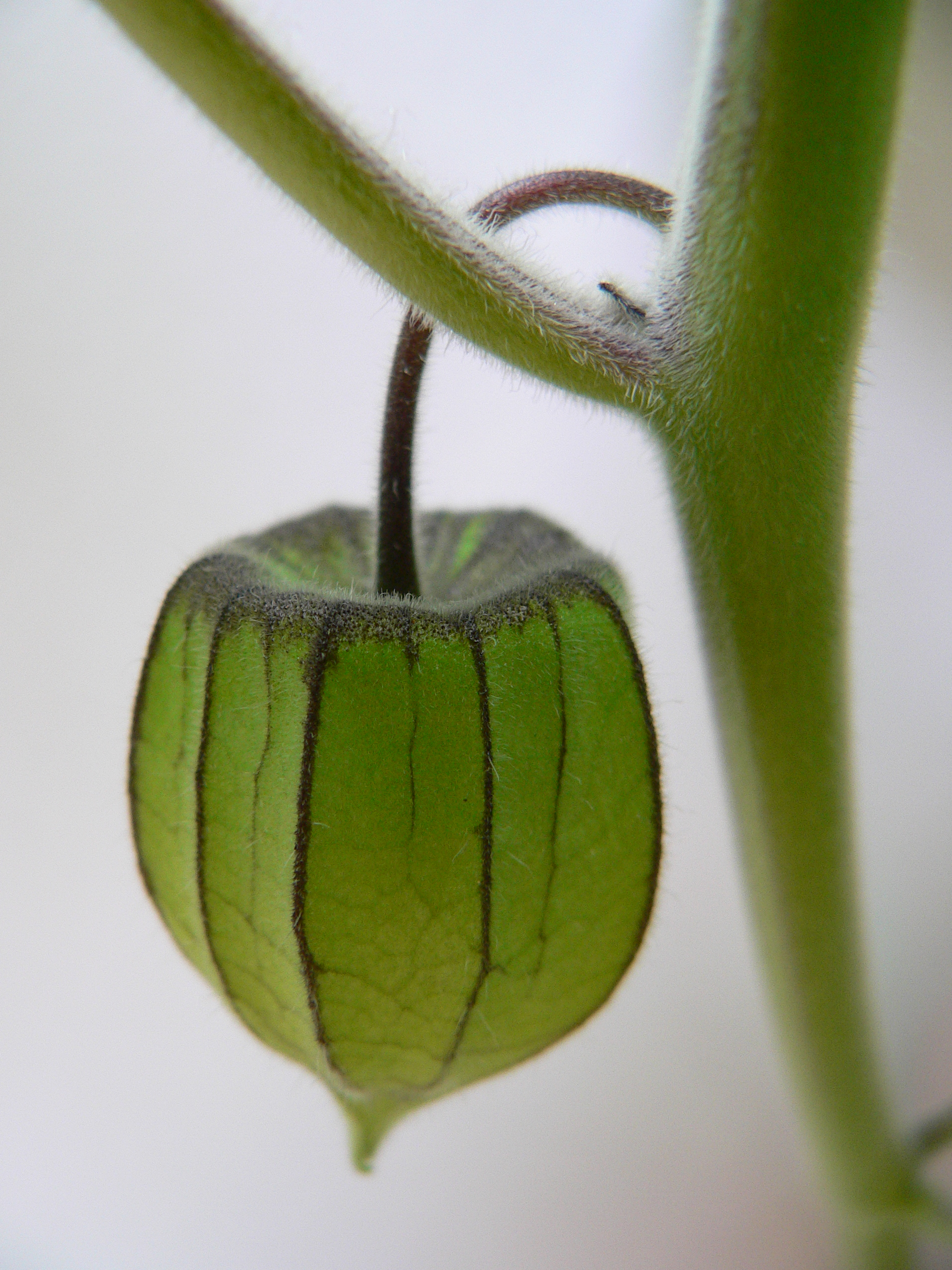
Immature fruit in green calyx

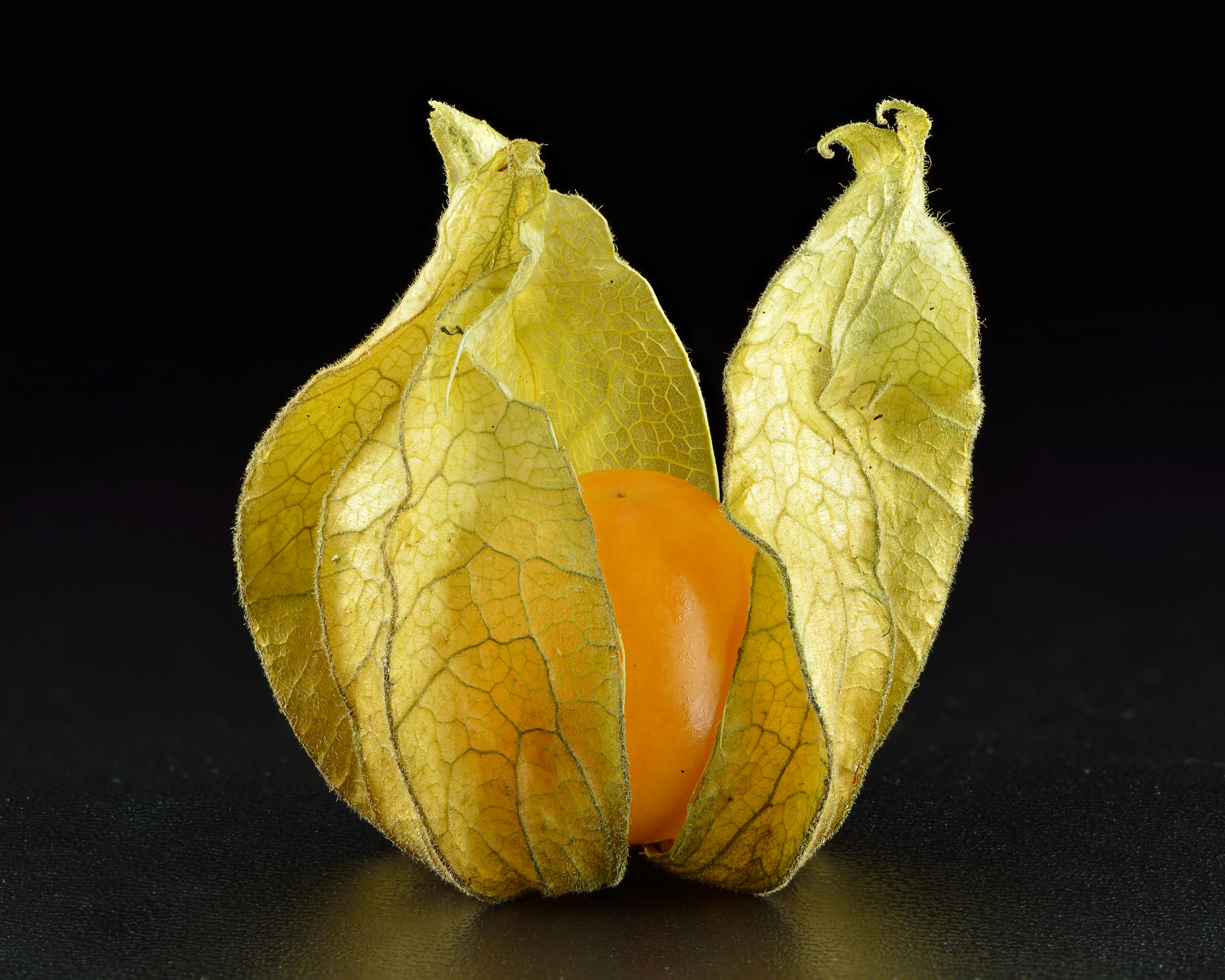
Calyx open, exposing the ripe fruit

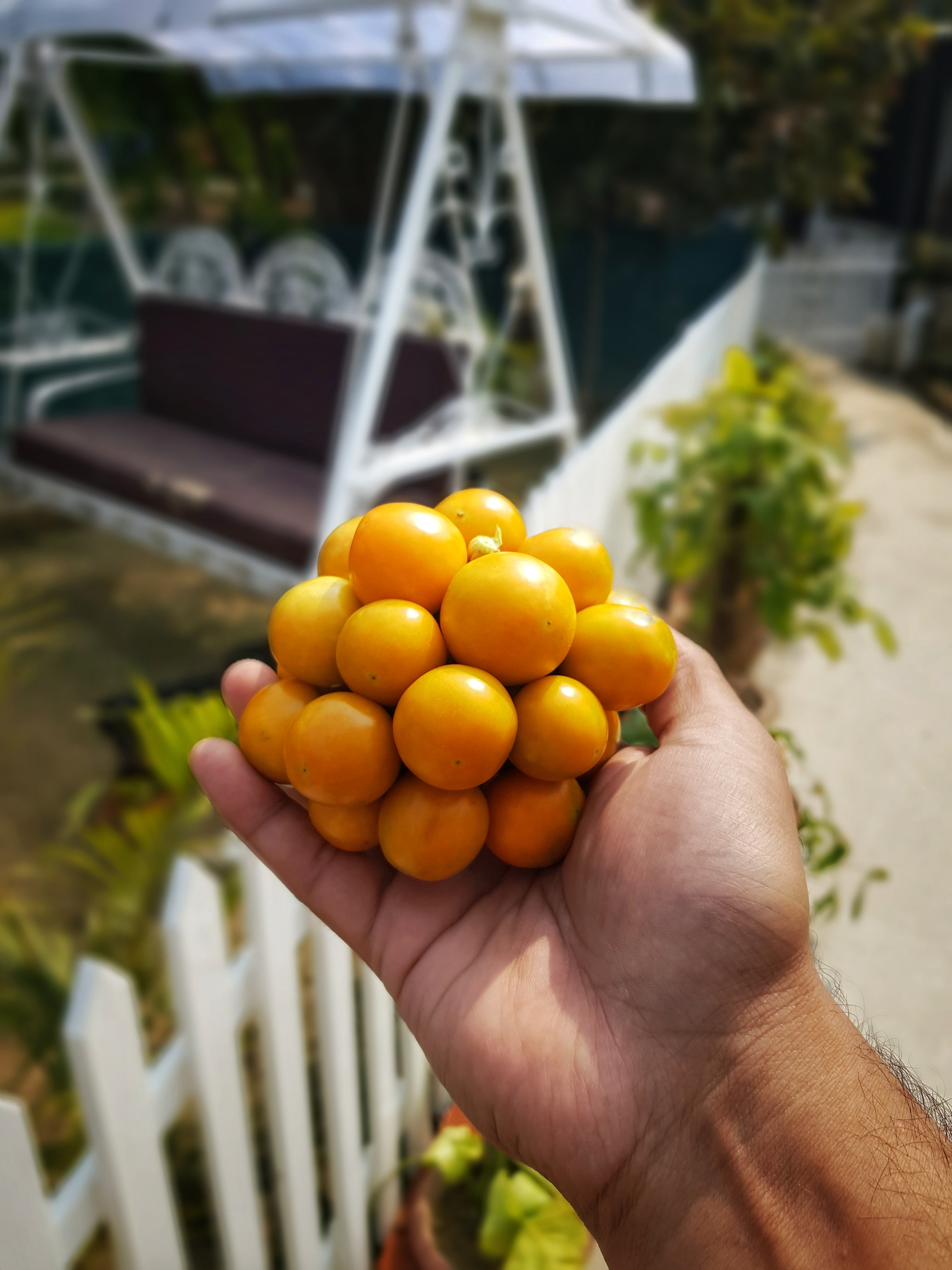
Fruit bunch in hand

== Taxonomy ==
P. peruviana is closely related to the tomatillo. As a member of the plant family Solanaceae, it is also more distantly related to a large number of edible plants, including tomatoes, eggplants, and potatoes.

Physalis peruviana was given a botanical species description by Carl Linnaeus in 1763. and given the genus name Physalis after the Greek φυσαλλίς (physallís, 'bladder, wind instrument') in reference to the calyx that surrounds the berry. The specific name peruviana refer to the country of Peru, one of the countries of the berry's origin.

It was grown in England in 1774 and by early settlers of South Africa's Cape of Good Hope before 1807. Whether it was grown there before its introduction to England is not known, but sources since the mid-19th century attribute the common English name "Cape gooseberry" to this fact. An alternative suggestion is that name refers to the calyx surrounding the fruit like a cape, possibly an example of false etymology, because it does not appear in publications earlier than the mid-20th century. Not long after its introduction to South Africa, P. peruviana was introduced to Australia, New Zealand and various Pacific islands. Despite its common name, it is not botanically related to the true gooseberries of the genus Ribes.

In Peru, P. peruviana is known as aguaymanto in Spanish and topotopo in Quechua. In neighboring Colombia, it is known by its Aymara name as uchuva, and as uvilla (Spanish for 'little grape') in Ecuador.

== Distribution and habitat ==
The species is reportedly native to Chile and Peru. Its center of genetic diversity is in the Andes Mountains of Ecuador, Chile, Colombia, and Peru. It grows in forests, forest edges, and riparian areas. It grows at high elevations of 500–3,000 m (1,600–9,800 ft) in its native region, but may also be found at sea level in Oceania and Pacific islands where it occurs widely in subtropical and warm, temperate conditions. Its latitude range is about 45°S to 60°N, and its altitude range is generally from sea level to 3,000 m (9,800 ft). The plant has become invasive in some natural habitats, forming thickets, particularly in Hawaii and on other Pacific islands. There are believed to be dozens of ecotypes worldwide that differentiated by plant size, calyx shape, and the size, color, and flavor of the fruit. Wild forms are thought to be diploid with 2n = 24 chromosomes, while cultivated forms include varieties with increased ploidy and 32 or 48 chromosomes.

== Cultivation ==
The history of P. peruviana cultivation in South America can be traced to the Inca Empire.

It has been widely introduced into cultivation in tropical, subtropical, and temperate areas such as Australia, China, India, Malaysia, and the Philippines. P. peruviana thrives at an annual average temperature from 13 to 18 °C (55 to 64 °F), tolerating temperatures as high as 30 °C (86 °F). It grows well in Mediterranean climates and is hardy to USDA hardiness zone 8, meaning it can be damaged by frost. It grows well in annual rainfalls of 800–4,300 mm (31–169 in) if the soil is well drained, prefers full sun or partial shade in well-drained soil, and grows vigorously in sandy loam.

The plant is readily grown from seeds, which are abundant (100 to 300 per fruit), but with low germination rates, requiring thousands of seeds to sow a hectare. Plants grown from year-old stem cuttings will flower early and yield well, but are less vigorous than those grown from seed.

=== Pests and diseases ===
In South Africa, cutworms attack the Cape gooseberry in seedbeds, red spider mites in the field, and potato tuber moths near potato fields. Hares damage young plants, and birds eat the fruits. Mites, whiteflies and flea beetles can also be problematic. Powdery mildew, soft brown scale, root rot and viruses may affect plants. In New Zealand, plants can be infected by Candidatus Liberibacter solanacearum.

== Potential toxicity ==
Unripe raw fruits, flowers, leaves, and stems of the plant contain solanine and solanidine alkaloids that may cause poisoning if ingested by humans, cattle or horses.

== Uses ==
Groundcherries (cape-gooseberries or poha), raw
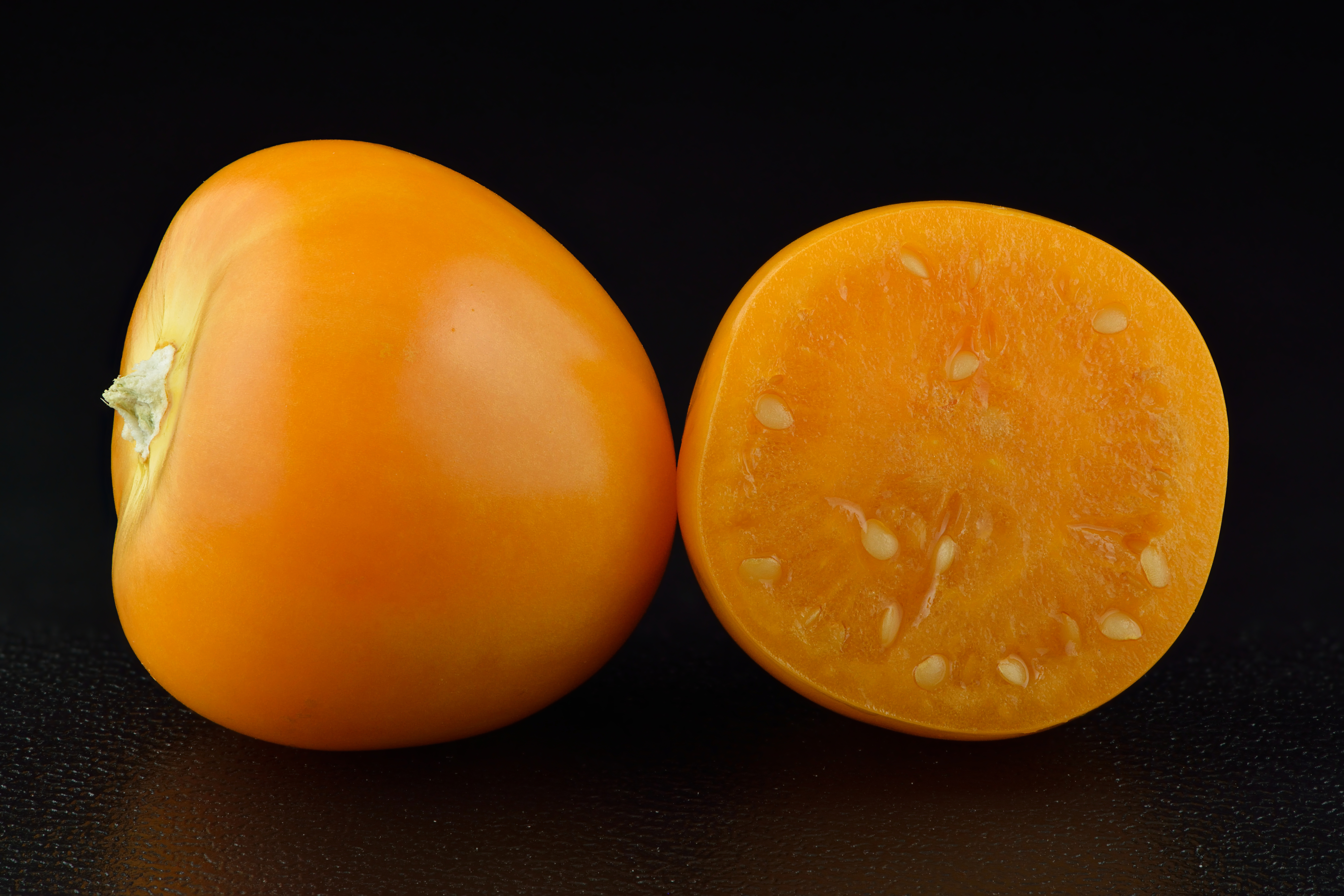

Nutritional value per 100 g (3.5 oz)
- Energy: 222 kJ (53 kcal)
- Carbohydrates: 11.2 g
- Fat: 0.7 g
- Protein: 1.9 g
Vitamins and minerals
Vitamins	Quantity %DV^{†}
Vitamin A equiv.	4% 36 μg
Thiamine (B1)	9% 0.11 mg
Riboflavin (B2)	3% 0.04 mg
Niacin (B3)	18% 2.8 mg
Vitamin C	12% 11 mg
Minerals	Quantity %DV^{†}
Calcium	1% 9 mg
Iron	6% 1 mg
Phosphorus	3% 40 mg
- Other constituents: Quantity
- Water: 85.4 g
- Link to USDA Database entry
- ^{†}Percentages estimated using US recommendations for adults.

=== Nutrition ===
Raw Cape gooseberries are 85% water, 11% carbohydrates, 2% protein, and 1% fat. In a reference amount of 100 grams (3.5 oz), raw Cape gooseberries supply 53 calories and provide moderate levels (10–19% of the Daily Value) of niacin and vitamin C.

Analyses of oil from different berry components, primarily its seeds, showed that linoleic acid and oleic acid were the main fatty acids, beta-sitosterol and campesterol were principal phytosterols, and the oil contained vitamin K and beta-carotene.

=== Culinary ===
P. peruviana is an economically useful crop as an exotic exported fruit, and is favored in breeding and cultivation programs of many countries. P. peruviana fruits are marketed in the United States as goldenberry and sometimes Pichuberry, named after Machu Picchu in order to associate the fruit with its cultivation in Peru.

Cape gooseberries are made into fruit-based sauces, pies, puddings, chutneys, jams and ice cream, or eaten fresh in salads and fruit salads. In Latin America, it is often consumed as a batido or smoothie, and because of its showy husk, it is used in restaurants as a decorative garnish for desserts. To enhance its food uses, hot air drying improves qualities of dietary fiber content, texture and appearance.

In basic research on fruit maturation, the content of polyphenols and vitamin C varied by cultivar, harvest time, and ripening stage.

== See also ==
- Physalis pubescens – a closely related species with sprouts that are noticeably less hairy
