= Pingbeinine =

Names
- IUPAC name 28-Methyl-16,28-secosolanid-5-ene-3β,16β,25-triol
- Systematic IUPAC name (1R,2S,3aS,3bS,7S,9aR,9bS,11aS)-1-{(1S)-1-[(2R,5R)-5-Hydroxy-1,5-dimethylpiperidin-2-yl]ethyl}-9a,11a-dimethyl-2,3,3a,3b,4,6,7,8,9,9a,9b,10,11,11a-tetradecahydro-1H-cyclopenta[a]phenanthrene-2,7-diol

Identifiers
CAS Number	131984-89-9
3D model (JSmol)	Interactive image
ChemSpider	116190
PubChem CID	131457
UNII	37P8E5LJ3X
CompTox Dashboard (EPA)	DTXSID20927487
- InChI: InChI=1S/C28H47NO3/c1-17(23-10-11-26(2,32)16-29(23)5)25-24(31)15-22-20-7-6-18-14-19(30)8-12-27(18,3)21(20)9-13-28(22,25)4/h6,17,19-25,30-32H,7-16H2,1-5H3/t17-,19+,20-,21+,22+,23-,24+,25+,26-,27+,28+/m1/s1 Key: JTBAWWCDNDKCDH-NCGAYPANSA-N; InChI=1/C28H47NO3/c1-17(23-10-11-26(2,32)16-29(23)5)25-24(31)15-22-20-7-6-18-14-19(30)8-12-27(18,3)21(20)9-13-28(22,25)4/h6,17,19-25,30-32H,7-16H2,1-5H3/t17-,19+,20-,21+,22+,23-,24+,25+,26-,27+,28+/m1/s1 Key: JTBAWWCDNDKCDH-NCGAYPANBB
- SMILES: O[C@]1(C)CC[C@@H](N(C)C1)[C@@H](C)[C@H]4[C@@H](O)C[C@H]3[C@@H]5C/C=C2/C[C@@H](O)CC[C@]2(C)[C@H]5CC[C@@]34C

Properties
Chemical formula	C_{28}H_{47}NO_{3}
Molar mass	445.688 g·mol^{−1}
- Except where otherwise noted, data are given for materials in their standard state (at 25 °C [77 °F], 100 kPa). Infobox references

Pingbeinine is a steroidal alkaloid isolated from Fritillaria.
