= Asagraea =

Asagraea may refer to:

- Asagraea Baill., 1870, a genus in the family Fabaceae
- Asagraea Lindl., 1839, a genus in the family Melanthiaceae
