= C27H43NO8 =

The molecular formula C_{27}H_{43}NO_{8} (molar mass: 509.63 g/mol, exact mass: 509.2989 u) may refer to:

- Colforsin
- Veracevine
