= Steroidal alkaloid =

Class of chemical compounds

Chemical structure of solanidine, a steroidal alkaloid found in potatoes

Steroidal alkaloids have the basic steroidal skeleton with nitrogen-based functional groups attached to the skeleton. More specifically, they are distinguished by their tetracyclic cyclopentanoperhydrophenanthrene skeleton that marks their close relationship with sterols.

== Examples ==
=== Apocynaceae steroid alkaloids ===
The family of apocynaceae alkaloids can be categorized based on their backbone structure, which may include the 5α-pregnane, Δ^{5}-pregnane, or conanine backbone. Typically, these alkaloids feature an amino group or an oxygen compound at the 3rd carbon atom. An illustrative example is latifolinin, which is derived from the conanine backbone. This distinctive structure is characterized by a five-membered ring formed by an amino group bonded to both the 18th and 20th carbon atoms.

Latifolinin is a compound that is naturally present in the bark of Funtumia. Additionally, the leaves of this plant contain two other compounds, namely funtumin and funtumidin. These compounds belong to the Apocynaceae steroid alkaloids family and share the 5α-pregnan backbone structure.

Latifolinin

=== Batrachotoxins ===
Batrachotoxins are neurotoxins that are naturally occurring on the dermal surface of poison dart frogs. The photo shows the Phyllobates terribilis. Batrachotoxins share a structural foundation with pregnanes, consisting of 21 carbon atoms, and are distinctive for the amino group attached to the 18th carbon atom, exemplified by batrachotoxin A (see image).

Batrachotoxinin A

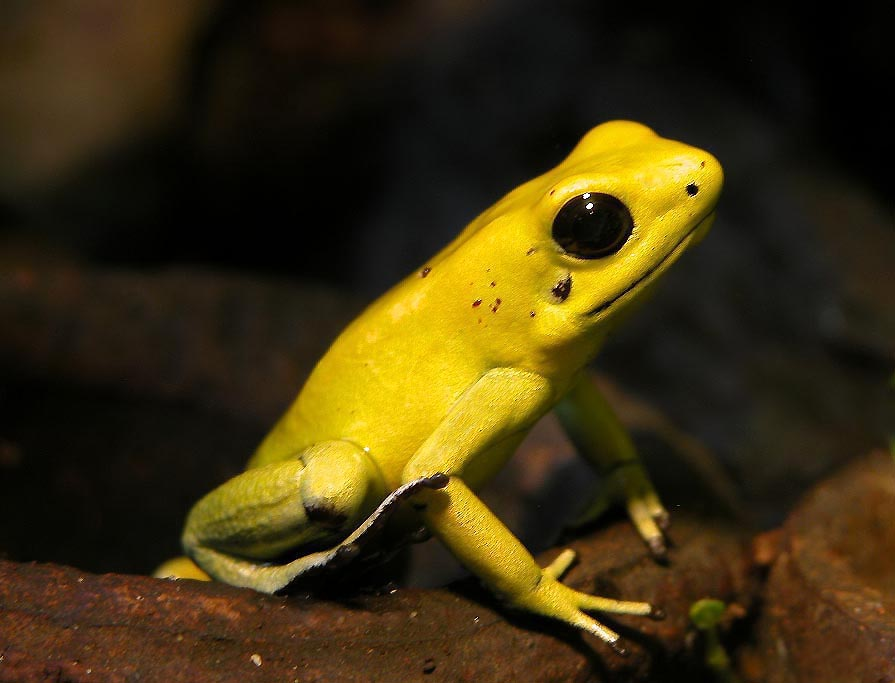
poison dart frog

=== Bufotoxins ===
The bufotoxins are named after the genus of Bufo. The α-pyranones at the 17th carbon atom are specific for the bufotoxins. The bufotoxin shown here is a sterane derivative with an α-pyranone at the 17th carbon atom and an esterified succinic acid at the 3rd carbon atom with arginine attached.

Bufotoxin

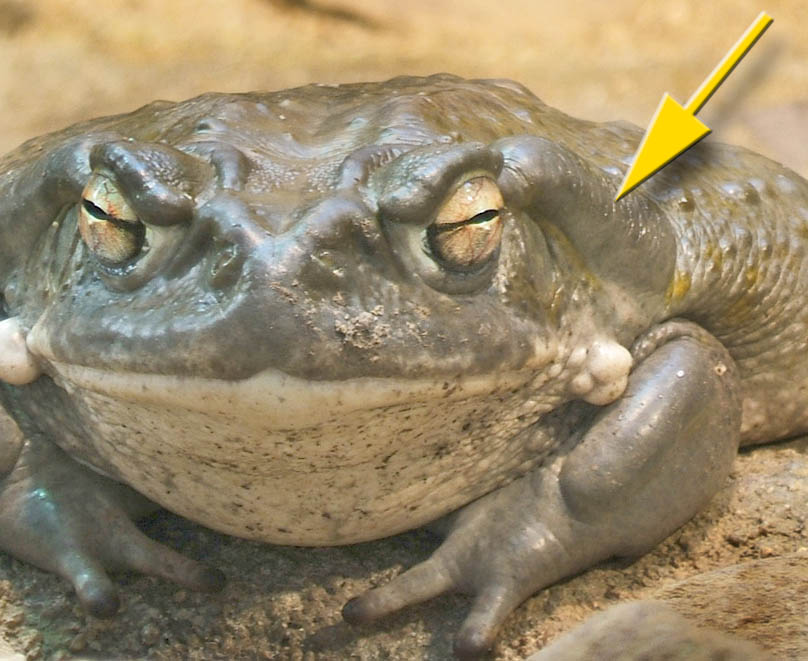
Bufotoxin is found on the skin of toads of the genus true toad (Bufo).

=== Buxus steroid alkaloids ===
Buxus steroid alkaloids are present in the leaves of Buxus sempervirens. This tree primarily thrives in southern and central Europe. These alkaloids are characterized by an amino group attached to the 3rd and/or 20th carbon atom. Methylation of the amino groups can be partial, complete, or absent. Buxus steroid alkaloids constitute a substantial group of bases, most of which can be categorized into three distinct groups.

Another subgroup of Buxus steroid alkaloids possesses a tetracyclic structure. In these compounds, a bond exists between the 9th and 19th carbon atoms, forming a seven-membered ring (ring B). Buxamine E serves as an example of this group.

The third major group is distinguished by the absence of additional carbon atoms bonded to the 4th carbon atom of the A ring. Buxandonin L is an illustrative member of this category.

The largest group consists of pentacyclic Buxus steroid alkaloids, featuring a core structure based on 4,4,14-trimethyl-9,19-cyclopregnan. Cyclobuxin D is a representative of this particular group.

Buxamine E

Buxandonin L

Cyclobuxin D

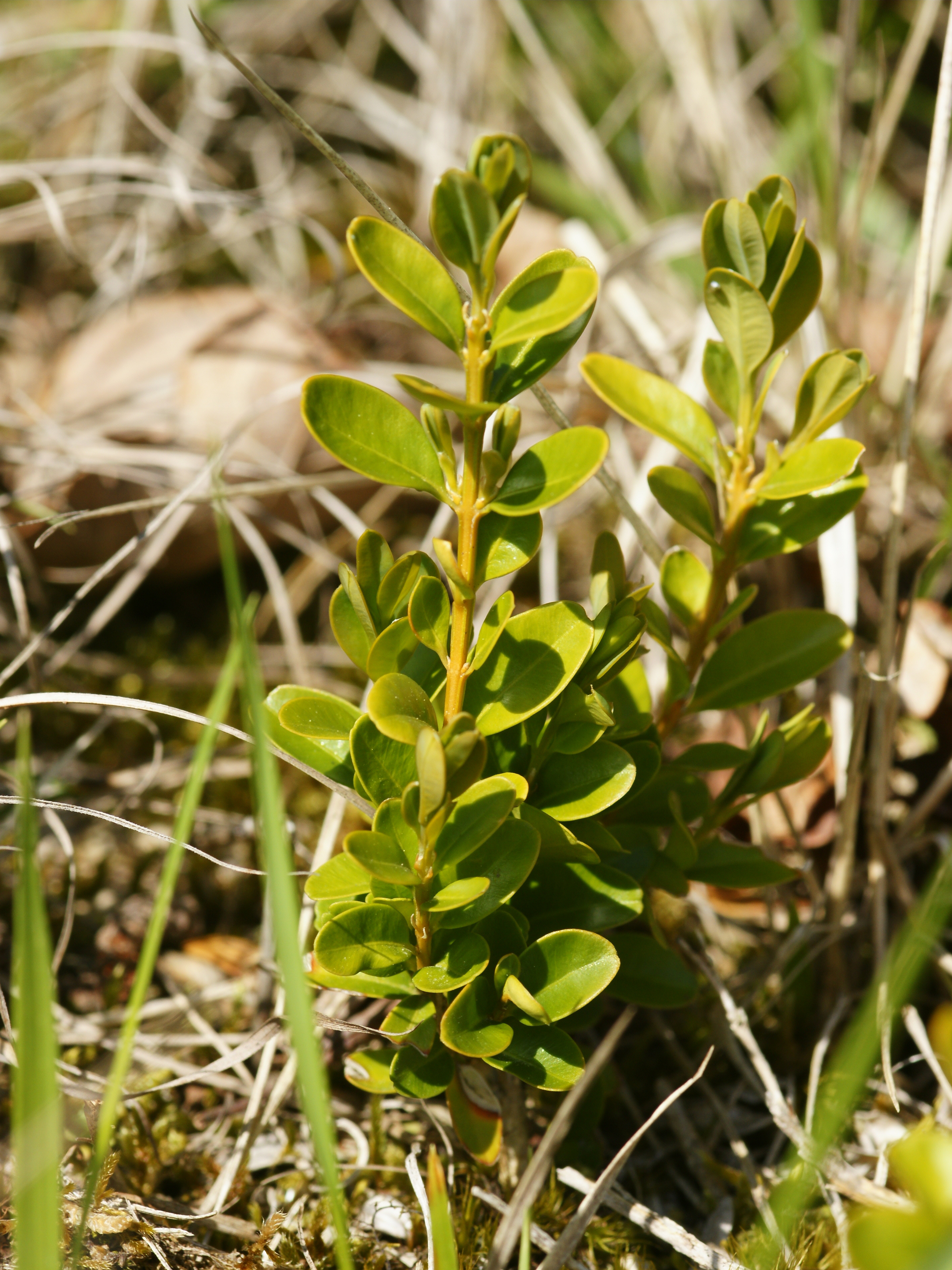
Common boxwood (Buxus sempervirens)

=== Salamander alkaloids ===
The toxic salamander alkaloids occur naturally in organisms classified within the genus Salamandra. These alkaloids are derived from 3-aza-A-homo-5β-androstane. One notable example is samandarin (see figure), which may serve as the primary alkaloid depending on the species, although it may not be present in some other organisms at all. Samandarin possesses a distinctive oxazolidine structure within the A ring. Besides samandarin, there are several other steroid alkaloids in Salamandra organisms such as samandaridin, samandarone, and cycloneosamandione.

Samandarin

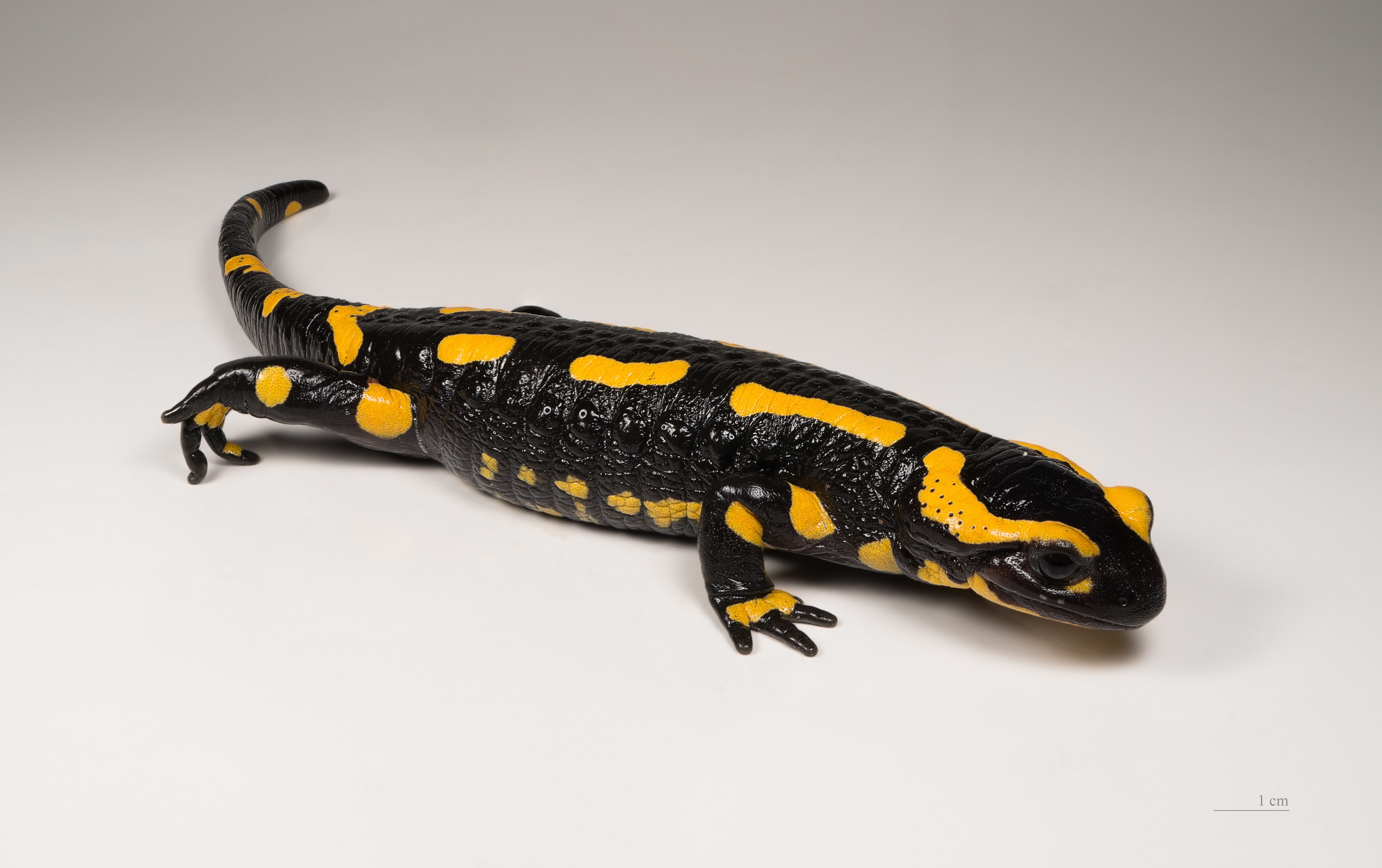
Salamander alkaloids, such as samandarin, occur on the skin of animals of the genus Salamandra.

=== Solanum alkaloids ===
These compounds generally appear as their corresponding glycoside in plants of the genus Solanum. Solanum includes plants like potatoes, tomatoes, and various nightshades Starting with cholesterol, the biosynthesis of these compounds follow a similar general mechanism including hydroxylation, oxidation, and transamination before differentiating. Alkaloids found in these plants include chaconine, solanine, solasodine, tomatidine, tomatine, and solanidine. The Itkin group has found several of the biosynthetic gene clusters for these. In Itkin et al. 2011 and Itkin et al. 2013 they find several BSGs for α-tomatine in tomato and α-solanine in potato. Typically they are used in plants as a protection mechanism against animals. Due to the typical anti-cholinesterase activity, they can be used as poisons against the plants' predators. They can be used as starting materials for steroidal drugs. There are various tests for identifying these alkaloids. The characteristic test involves dissolving the compound in hot amyl alcohol or ethanol and watching for the formation of a jelly-like product as the mixture cools.

==== Solanidan skeleton ====
Steroidal alkaloids with a solanidan backbone exhibit a distinctive bicyclic structure, which replaces the cholesterol side chain on the D-ring. A notable example is solanocapsin, as discovered in the coral shrub (Solanum pseudocapsicum).

Solanocapsin

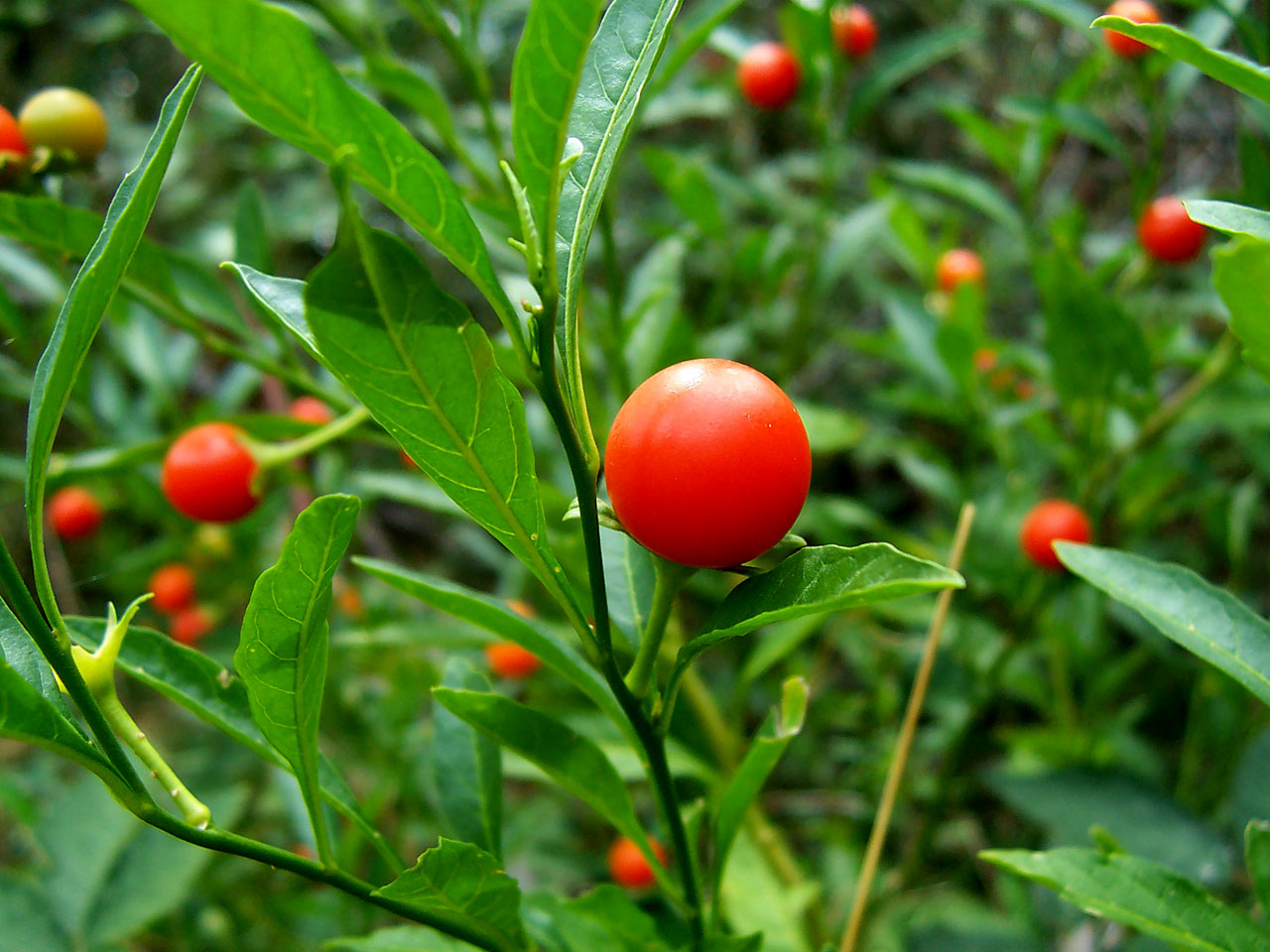
Solanocapsin is found, among other things, in the fruits of the Jerusalem cherry (Solanum pseudocapsicum).

==== Spirosolan backbone ====
Another category of solanum alkaloids is based on the spirosolane skeleton. In these compounds, the E-ring is a tetrahydrofuran to which a piperidine is directly attached via a spiro compound. An example of such a steroid alkaloid is tomatidenol, which is prevalent across various species within the genus Solanum.

Tomatidenol

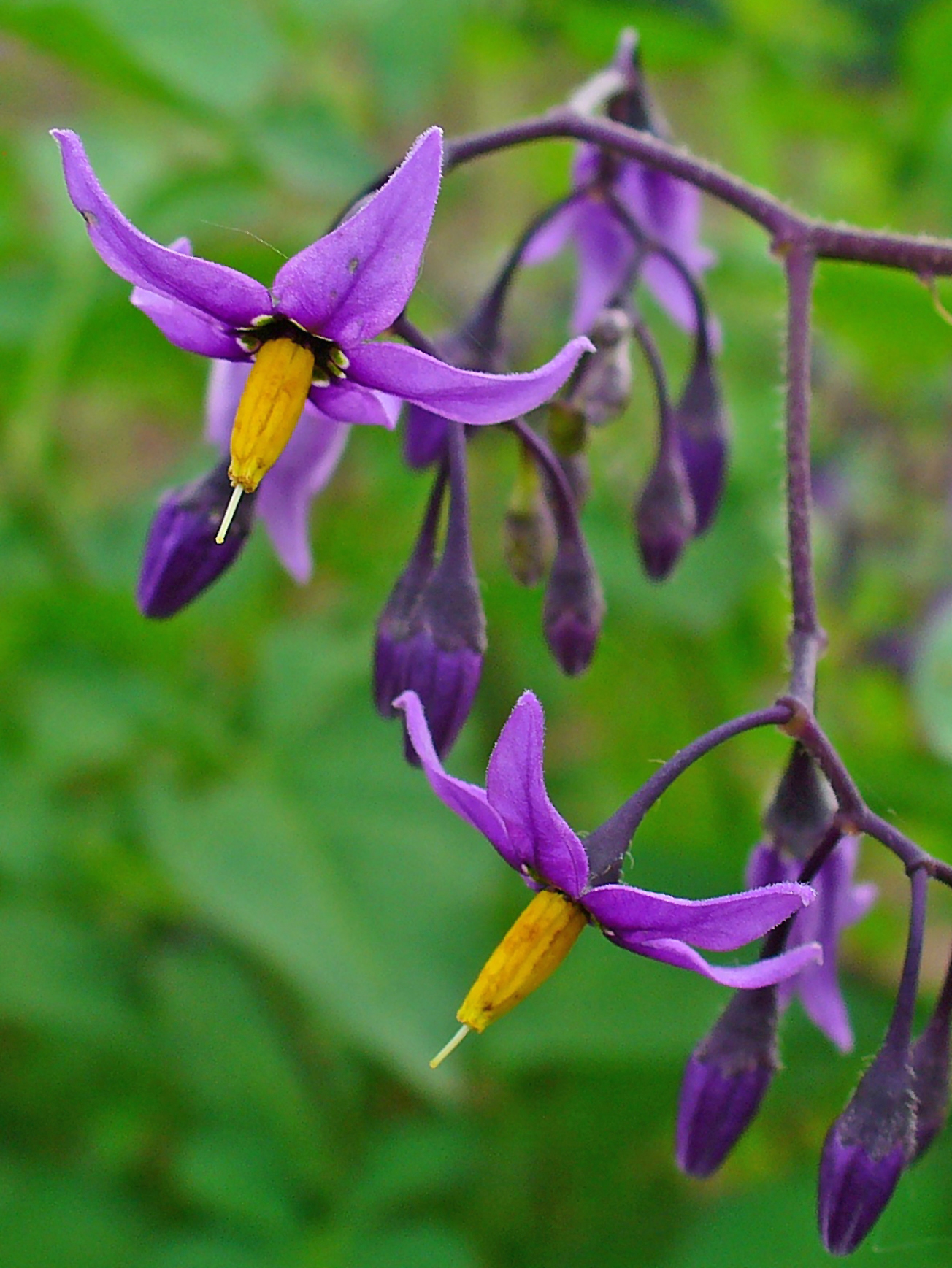
Tomatidenol is found, among other things, in the leaves of the bittersweet nightshade (Solanum dulcamara). This plant species belongs to the nightshade genus. Tomatidenol forms the main alkamin in the species of Solanum dulcarama, which are native to Europe.

=== Veratrum alkaloids ===
==== Veratrum alkaloids of white/green chervil ====
The veratrum alkaloids derive their name from the white and green germer plants (Veratrum album and Veratrum viride, respectively). These plants belong to the Liliaceae family. Among them, procevin is a special case, as it features a nitrogen atom from piperidine connected to the 18th carbon.

Veratramine is an example of veratrum steroid alkaloids, characterized by a 22,26-epimino-14-abeo-cholestane ring system as their basis.

Procevin

Veratramin

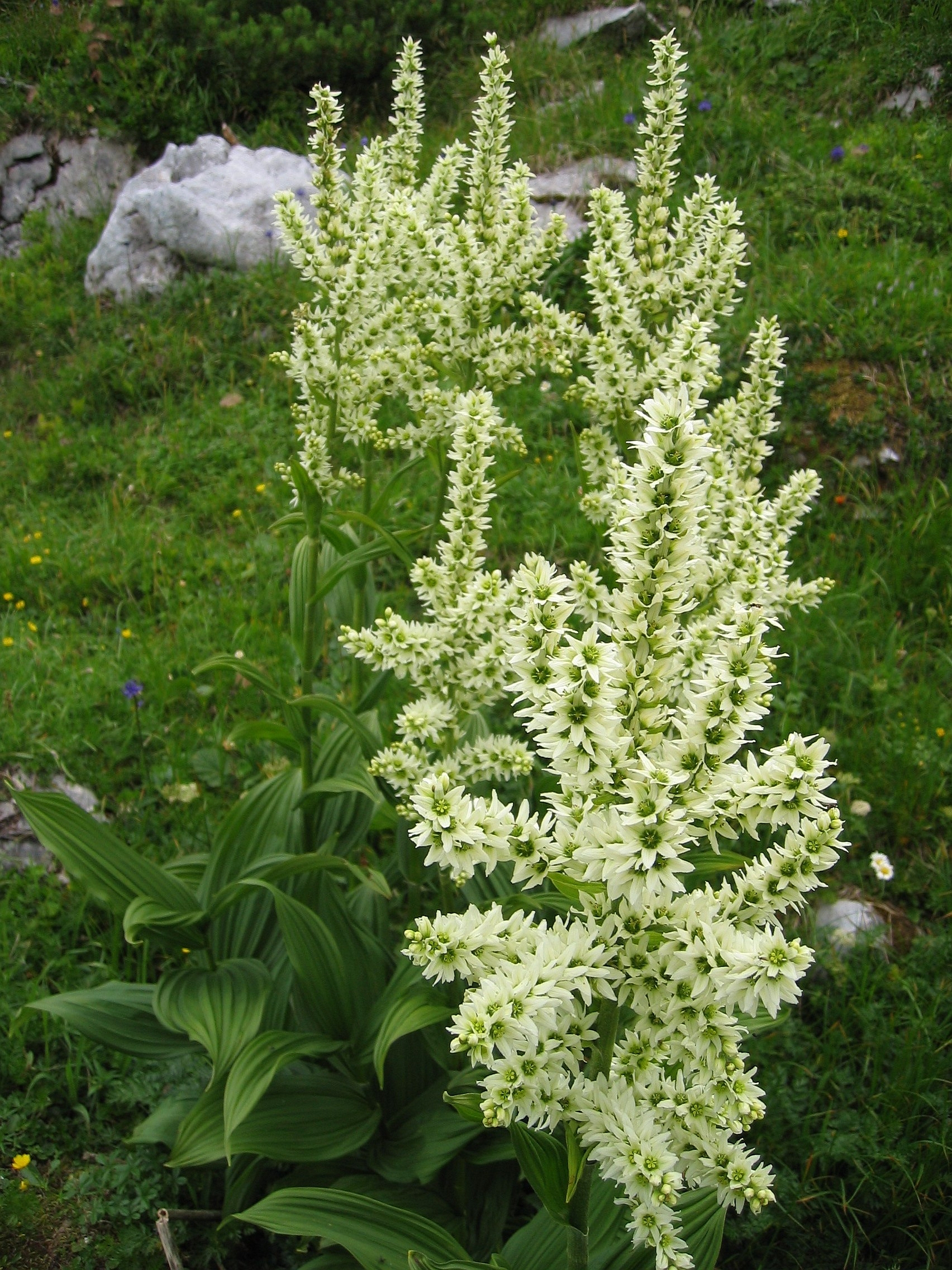
Procevin and veratramin occur, among other things, in white veratrum (Veratrum album grandiflorum).

==== Veratrum alkaloids of sabadill ====
Veracevin is a member of the veratrum alkaloids group. However, this occurs in the sabadilla (Schoenocaulon officinale), which also belongs to the Liliaceae family. The veracevin is based on the cevan skeleton, in which the C-ring is a five-membered instead of a six-membered ring and the D-ring is a six-membered ring. Furthermore, the high number of hydroxy groups is still remarkable.

Veracevin

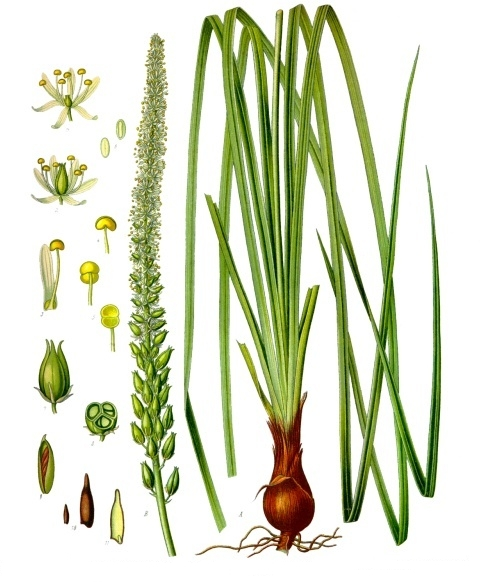
Veracevin occurs in the Sabadilla (Schoenocaulon officinale).

=== Veratrum alkaloids ===
True to their name, Veratrum alkaloids come from plants of the genus Veratrum. Alkaloids are found in the roots and rhizomes of these plants. They include veratridine, cyclopamine, and jervine. Because of their actions on the cardiovascular, neuromuscular, and respiratory systems, Veratrum alkaloids have been used for the treatment of various conditions like myasthenia gravis, hypotension, and eclampsia.

== Bioactivity ==
Steroidal alkaloids have been investigated for a wide range of potential bioactivities including antimicrobial, anti-inflammatory, anti-estrogenic, and chemotherapeutic activity. These bioactivities are the result of a wide array of mechanisms across different compounds. For example, solasodine antimicrobial bioactivity is accomplished by interfering with the synthesis of DNA in Saccharomyces cerevisiae and Prototheca wickerhamii. Tomatidine synergistically works with aminoglycoside antibiotics against S. aureus.

Antiinflammation is similarly accomplished with a variety of mechanisms. Solasodine, for example, reduces interleukin-2 and -8 production whereas tomatidine inhibits specific nuclear translocation, JNK activation, as well as induce nitrous oxide synthase. Lastly, nine steroidal alkaloids have significant antiestrogenic activity whereas seven inhibit estrone sulfatase.

However, in addition to their therapeutic benefits, steroidal alkaloids, specifically veratrum alkaloids, are potentially deadly.

Veratrum alkaloid compounds act by attaching to voltage-gated sodium ion channels, altering their permeability. Veratrum alkaloids cause affected sodium channels to reactivate 1000x slower than unaffected channels. Furthermore, veratrum alkaloids block inactivation of sodium channels and lower their activation threshold so they remain open even at resting potential. As a result, sodium concentrations within the cell rise, leading to increased nerve and muscle excitability. These biochemical channels cause muscle contractions, repetitive firing of the nerves and an irregular heart rhythm caused by stimulation of vagal nerves which control the parasympathetic functions of the heart, lungs and digestive tract.
