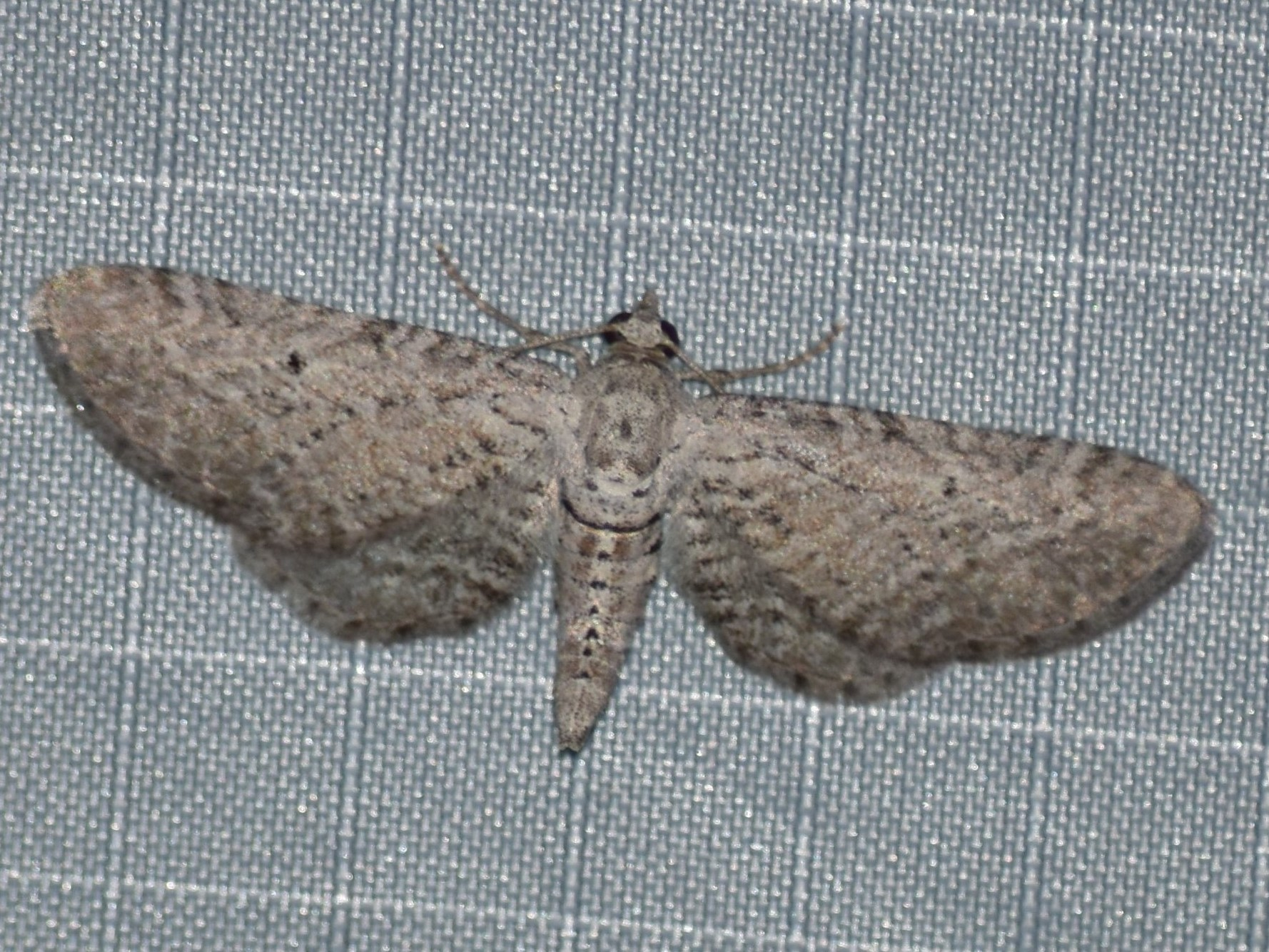

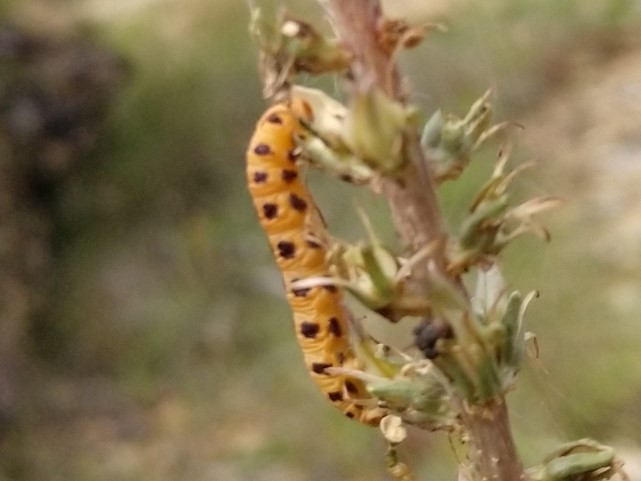
- Adult (top) and larva (bottom)

Scientific classification
- Kingdom: Animalia
- Phylum: Arthropoda
- Clade: Pancrustacea
- Class: Insecta
- Order: Lepidoptera
- Family: Geometridae
- Genus: Eupithecia
- Species: E. zygadeniata

Binomial name
- Eupithecia zygadeniata Packard, 1876

Synonyms
- Tephroclystia tenebrescens Hulst, 1900

= Eupithecia zygadeniata =

Species of moth

Eupithecia zygadeniata is a species of moth in the family Geometridae. It was first described by Alpheus Spring Packard in 1876 and is found in North America, with records from Texas and Montana. Adults have been recorded on wing in June and July.

The larvae feed within the seed capsules of Schoenocaulon texanum.
