= Veracevine =

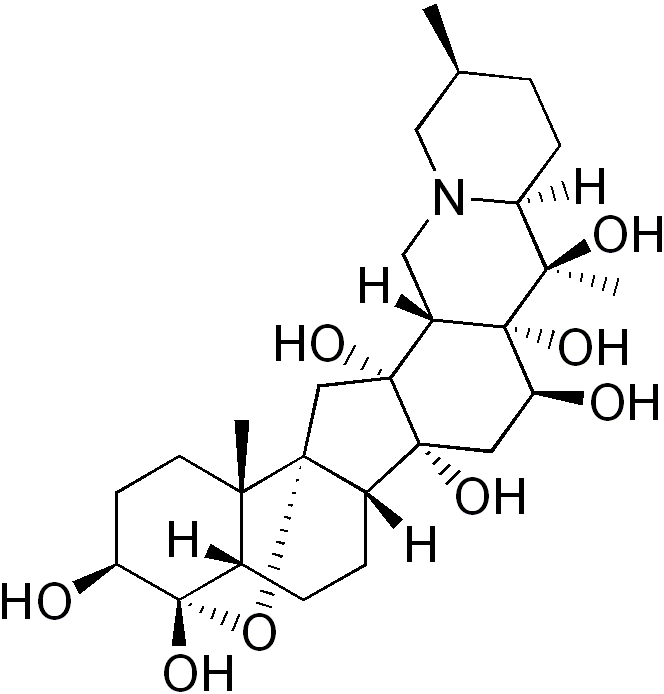

Names
- IUPAC name 4α,9-Epoxycevane-3β,4β,12,14,16β,17,20-heptol
- Systematic IUPAC name (3S,4S,4aS,6aS,6bR,8S,8aS,9R,9aS,12S,15aS,15bR,16aR,16bS)-9,12,16b-Trimethyldocosahydro-2H-4,16a-epoxybenzo[4,5]indeno[1,2-h]pyrido[1,2-b]isoquinoline-3,4,6b,8,8a,9,15b-heptol
- Other names Protocevine

Identifiers
CAS Number	5876-23-3
3D model (JSmol)	Interactive image
ChEBI	CHEBI:9947
ChEMBL	ChEMBL2023796
ChemSpider	391289
KEGG	C10828
PubChem CID	442986
UNII	U3QTV3Z77R
CompTox Dashboard (EPA)	DTXSID501027212
- InChI: InChI=1S/C27H43NO8/c1-14-4-7-18-22(3,31)26(34)17(12-28(18)11-14)24(33)13-25-16(23(24,32)10-20(26)30)6-5-15-21(25,2)9-8-19(29)27(15,35)36-25/h14-20,29-35H,4-13H2,1-3H3/t14-,15-,16-,17-,18-,19-,20-,21-,22+,23+,24+,25+,26-,27-/m0/s1 Key: MZHXYVMEVBEFAL-XXFAKQOHSA-N; InChI=1/C27H43NO8/c1-14-4-7-18-22(3,31)26(34)17(12-28(18)11-14)24(33)13-25-16(23(24,32)10-20(26)30)6-5-15-21(25,2)9-8-19(29)27(15,35)36-25/h14-20,29-35H,4-13H2,1-3H3/t14-,15-,16-,17-,18-,19-,20-,21-,22+,23+,24+,25+,26-,27-/m0/s1 Key: MZHXYVMEVBEFAL-XXFAKQOHBG
- SMILES: C[C@H]1CC[C@H]2[C@@]([C@]3([C@H](C[C@]4([C@@H]5CC[C@H]6[C@]7([C@]5(C[C@]4([C@@H]3CN2C1)O)O[C@@]6([C@H](CC7)O)O)C)O)O)O)(C)O

Properties
Chemical formula	C_{27}H_{43}NO_{8}
Molar mass	509.63 g/mol
- Except where otherwise noted, data are given for materials in their standard state (at 25 °C [77 °F], 100 kPa). verify (what is ?) Infobox references

Veracevine is an alkaloid that occurs in the seeds of Schoenocaulon officinale. It is used as an insecticide in veterinary medicine.

== See also ==
- Veratridine, a related alkaloid
