= Veratridine =

Steroidal alkaloid found in plants of the lily family

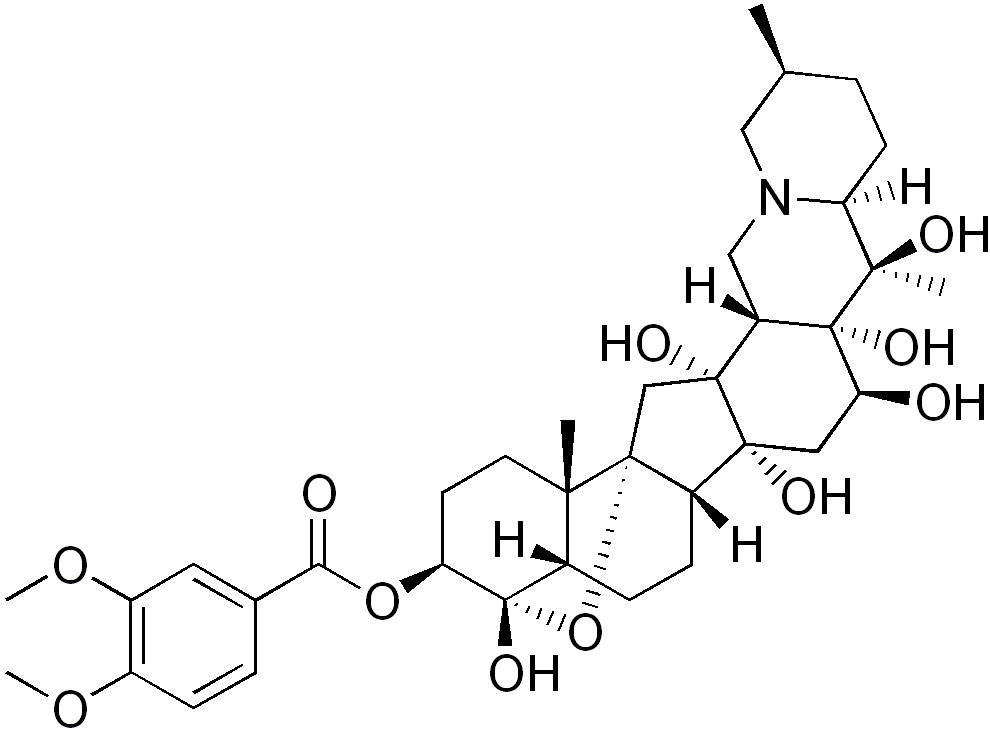

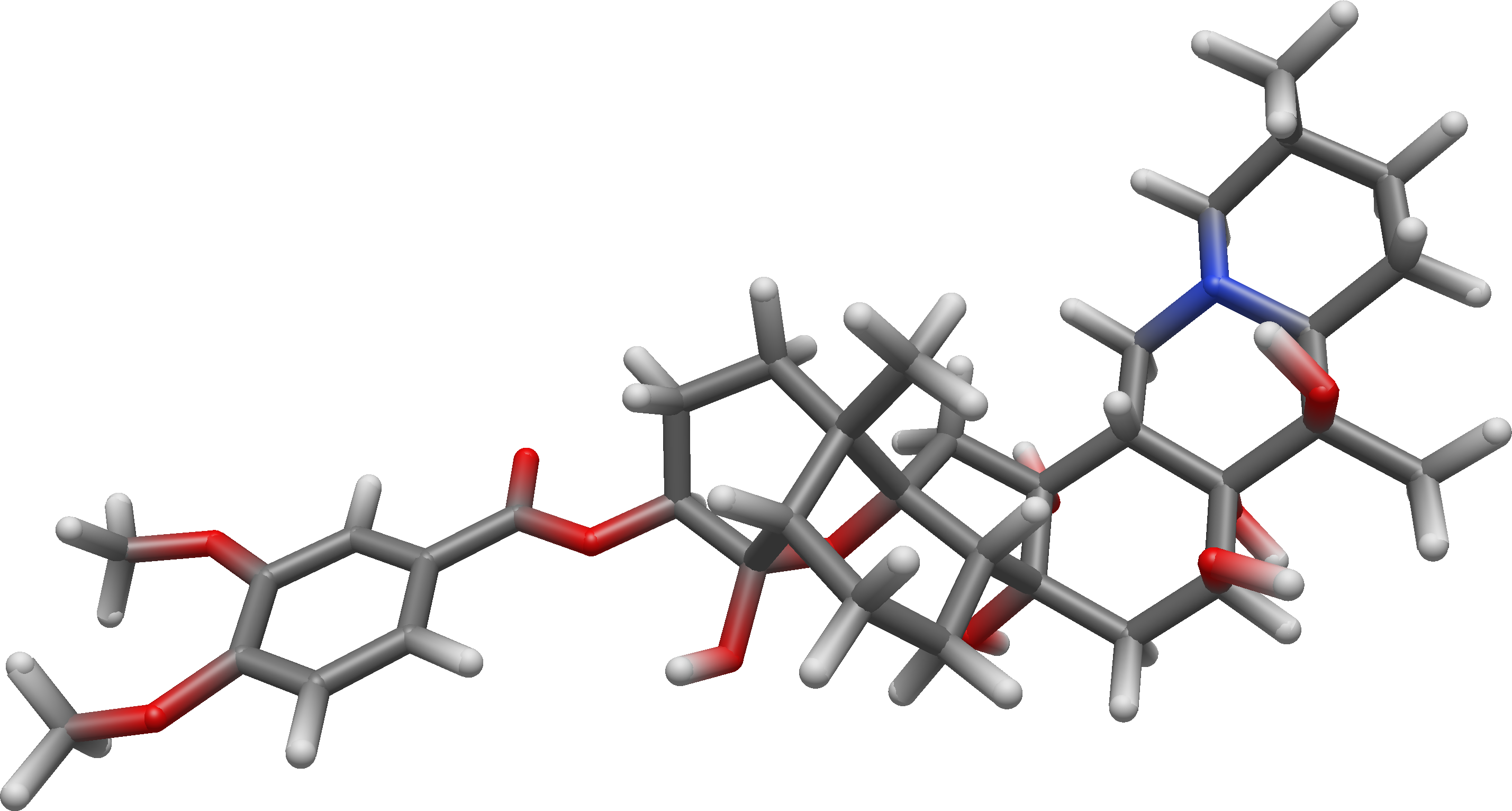

Names
- IUPAC name 4β,12,14,16β,17,20-Hexahydroxy-4α,9-epoxycevan-3β-yl 3,4-dimethoxybenzoate
- Systematic IUPAC name (3S,4S,4aS,6aS,6bR,8S,8aS,9R,9aS,12S,15aS,15bR,16aR,16bS)-4,6b,8,8a,9,15b-Hexahydroxy-9,12,16b-trimethyldocosahydro-2H-4,16a-epoxybenzo[4,5]indeno[1,2-h]pyrido[1,2-b]isoquinolin-3-yl 3,4-dimethoxybenzoate
- Other names (3β,4β,16β)-4,12,14,16,17,20-Hexahydroxy-4,9-epoxycevan-3yl 3,4-dimethoxybenzoate 3-Veratroylveracevine

Identifiers
CAS Number	71-62-5
3D model (JSmol)	Interactive image
ChEMBL	ChEMBL451227
ChemSpider	5290571
ECHA InfoCard	100.000.690
IUPHAR/BPS	2626
PubChem CID	6280
UNII	M4BNP1KR7W
CompTox Dashboard (EPA)	DTXSID2058467
- InChI: InChI=1S/C36H51NO11/c1-19-6-11-26-31(3,40)35(43)25(17-37(26)16-19)33(42)18-34-24(32(33,41)15-27(35)38)10-9-23-30(34,2)13-12-28(36(23,44)48-34)47-29(39)20-7-8-21(45-4)22(14-20)46-5/h7-8,14,19,23-28,38,40-44H,6,9-13,15-18H2,1-5H3/t19-,23-,24-,25-,26-,27-,28-,30-,31+,32+,33+,34+,35-,36-/m0/s1 Key: FVECELJHCSPHKY-YFUMOZOISA-N; InChI=1/C36H51NO11/c1-19-6-11-26-31(3,40)35(43)25(17-37(26)16-19)33(42)18-34-24(32(33,41)15-27(35)38)10-9-23-30(34,2)13-12-28(36(23,44)48-34)47-29(39)20-7-8-21(45-4)22(14-20)46-5/h7-8,14,19,23-28,38,40-44H,6,9-13,15-18H2,1-5H3/t19-,23-,24-,25-,26-,27-,28-,30-,31+,32+,33+,34+,35-,36-/m0/s1 Key: FVECELJHCSPHKY-YFUMOZOIBJ
- SMILES: O=C(O[C@H]7CC[C@@]1([C@@]65O[C@@]7(O)[C@H]1CC[C@H]6[C@@]2(O)[C@](O)([C@H]4[C@](O)([C@@H](O)C2)[C@@](O)(C)[C@H]3N(C[C@@H](C)CC3)C4)C5)C)c8ccc(OC)c(OC)c8

Properties
Chemical formula	C_{36}H_{51}NO_{11}
Molar mass	673.800 g·mol^{−1}
Melting point	160 to 180 °C (320 to 356 °F; 433 to 453 K)

Hazards
- Occupational safety and health (OHS/OSH)
Main hazards	Toxic
- Except where otherwise noted, data are given for materials in their standard state (at 25 °C [77 °F], 100 kPa). verify (what is ?) Infobox references

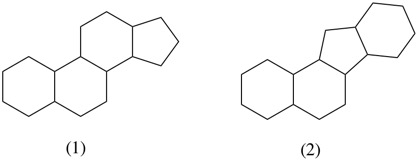
Unlike the typical 6-6-6-5 steroid ring backbone (1), veratridine displays a 6-6-5-6 arrangement (2).

Veratridine is a steroidal alkaloid found in plants related to lilies, specifically the genera Veratrum and Schoenocaulon. Upon absorption through the skin or mucous membranes, it acts as a neurotoxin by binding to and preventing the inactivation of voltage-gated sodium ion channels in heart, nerve, and skeletal muscle cell membranes. Veratridine increases nerve excitability and intracellular Ca^{2+} concentrations.

== Isolation ==
Veratridine has been isolated from the seeds of Schoenocaulon officinale and from the rhizomes of Veratrum album. Like the other steroidal alkaloids found in these plants and similar ones in the Melanthiaceae family, it is present as part of a glycosidal combination, bonded to carbohydrate moieties.

Early isolation methods relied on formation of the nitrate salt and then precipitation of the insoluble sulfate form. Accounts of these efforts date back to 1878, but the first true purification of veratridine is the one carried out in 1953 by Kupchan et al. This, and later purification procedures, begin with veratrine, a mixture of the alkaloids present in the Veratrum plants, primarily containing cevadine and veratridine. The nitrate salt is formed by dissolving the veratrine in 1% sulfuric acid over ice and precipitating with sodium nitrate. After resuspending in water over ice, the solution is brought to pH 8.5 with aqueous NaOH and then pH 10 with aqueous ammonia, forming another precipitate which is extracted with ether and then with chloroform. The ether and chloroform fractions are combined and dried. The dried residue is dissolved in sulfuric acid and the sulfate salt of veratridine is precipitated by dropwise addition of a solution of ammonium sulfate. Finally, the free base form is generated with ammonium hydroxide.

An even better isolation of veratridine from veratrine is achieved using high-performance liquid chromatography (HPLC); as commercially available veratridine may vary in purity, HPLC purification of veratrine is a preferred method for isolation of veratridine for biological studies.

== Chemistry ==
=== Structure ===
Veratridine is a derivative, the 3-veratroate ester, of veracevine, which belongs to the class of C-nor-D-homosteroidal alkaloids. The molecular structure and stereochemistry of this and related alkaloids were only established after decades of chemical investigations. The structure of veratridine has been confirmed by NMR spectroscopy and X-ray crystallography.

Veratridine displays an unusual steroidal backbone. In the typical four-ring nucleus with three six-membered rings and one five-membered ring (like the one in cholesterol), the five-membered ring is on the end. Veratridine, and other Veratrum alkaloids, have the five-membered ring between the second and third six-membered rings.

The benzene ring of veratridine can be derivatized under relatively mild reaction conditions, allowing late stage functionalization of the toxin.

=== Solubility ===
Veratridine has a pKa of 9.54. It is slightly soluble in ether, soluble in ethanol and DMSO, and freely soluble in chloroform. Solubility in water is pH-dependent; the free base form is slightly soluble, but easily dissolves in 1 M HCl. Its nitrate salt is slightly soluble in water. Its sulfate salt is very hygroscopic.

== Mechanism of action and applications ==
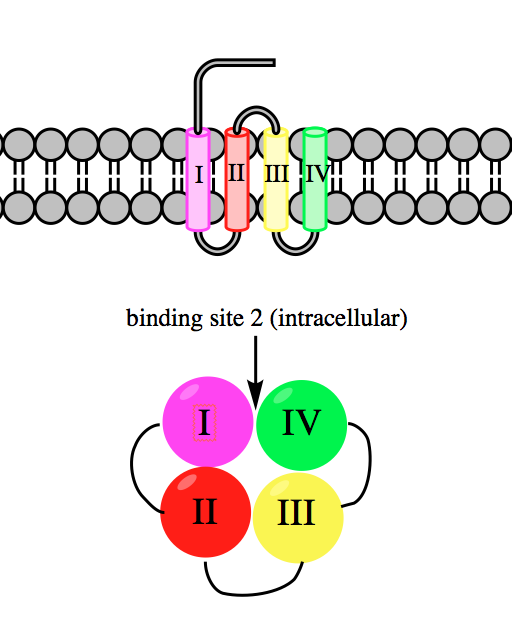
Veratridine binds at an intracellular site that covers parts of both domain I and domain IV of the voltage-gated sodium ion channel.

Veratridine acts as a neurotoxin by increasing nerve excitability. It binds to binding site 2 on the voltage-gated sodium channels (the same site bound by batrachotoxin, aconitine, and grayanotoxin), leading to persistent activation. Veratridine inhibits sodium channel inactivation by shifting the activation threshold toward a more negative potential. The resulting influx of Na^{+} also leads to the increase of intracellular Ca^{2+} concentrations, causing the overproduction of reactive oxygen species responsible for neuronal damage.

Veratridine is readily absorbed through the skin and mucous membranes and through ingestion. The tissues most affected are the heart, nerves, and skeletal muscles: main symptoms of veratridine toxicity include severe nausea, bradycardia, hypotension, difficulty breathing, salivation, and muscle weakness. Treatment involves the administration of activated charcoal, atropine, and benzodiazepines (if the affected individual is seizing).

Veratridine's ability to depolarize cells by affecting sodium channels lends it its applicability as a neuropharmacological tool for the study of electrical properties of nerve and muscle fibers. It has also been tested as a treatment for myasthenia gravis, in light of its potential to increase muscle responses to motor neuron stimulation.

Furthermore, this compound has recently been reported to increase sperm progressive motility (although it does not produce hyperactivation by itself). It has the potential of enhancing protein tyrosine phosphorylation, which takes place during capacitation, and its effects are inhibited in the presence of lidocaine and tetrodotoxin.

Veratridine has not been reported to have any effect on the acrosome reaction on its own, but it is able to block the progesterone-induced acrosome reaction. Moreover, veratridine has the effect of turning the membrane potential to a more positive one and also modifies the effect of progesterone on [Ca^{2+}]i and sperm membrane potential.

The activation of Na_{v}1.8 is a key point in Veratradine's mechanism of action and, consequently, this sodium ion channel coordinates the effects of this compound. Veratradine also activates additional Na_{V} channels. These facts contribute to support the importance of these Veratradine-sensitive proteins in the regulation of mature sperm function, such as human sperm fertility acquisition regulating motility, capacitation and the progesterone-induced acrosome reaction.

Veratridine has been synthetically modified to introduce a photoswitchable azobenzene group (azoveratridine) that allows controlling the Na_{V} potentiating activity with light in neurons and cardiac cells. Using this method, further late-stage modifications are possible, including the introduction of fluorescent and radioactive tags.
