= Chaconine =

Chemical compound

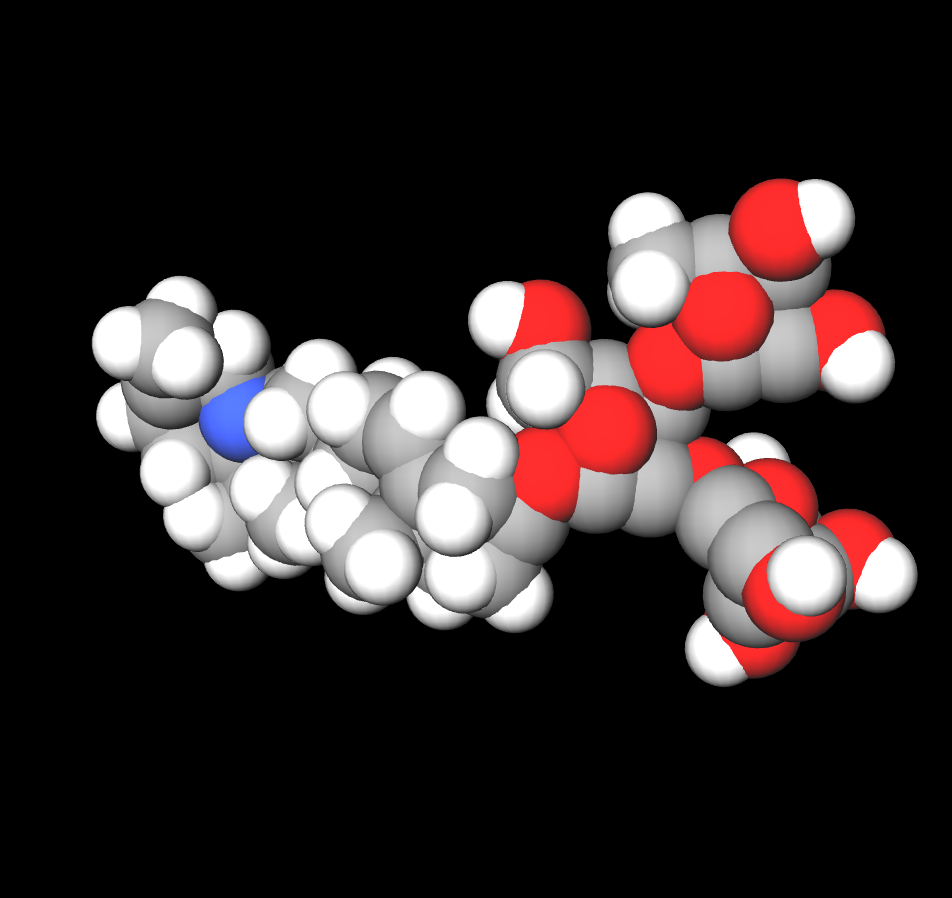
- 3D model of chaconine using MolView

Names
- IUPAC name Solanid-5-en-3β-yl α-L-rhamnopyranosyl-(1→2)-[α-L-rhamnopyranosyl-(1→4)]-β-D-glucopyranoside
- Systematic IUPAC name (2S,2′S,3R,3′R,4R,4′R,5R,5′R,6S,6′S)-2,2′-{[(2R,3S,4S,5R,6R)-4-Hydroxy-2-(hydroxymethyl)-6-{[(2S,4aR,4bS,6aS,6bR,7S,7aR,10S,12aS,13aS,13bS)-4a,6a,7,10-tetramethyl-1,3,4,4a,4b,5,6,6a,6b,7,7a,8,9,10,11,12a,13,13a,13b,14-icosahydro-2H-naphtho[2′,1′:4,5]indeno[1,2-b]indolizin-2-yl]oxy}oxane-3,5-diyl]bis(oxy)}bis(6-methyloxane-3,4,5-triol)
- Other names α-Chaconine, Chaconine

Identifiers
| CAS Number | 20562-03-2 |
| 3D model (JSmol) | Interactive image; Interactive image |
| Beilstein Reference | 77396 |
| ChEBI | CHEBI:10219 |
| ChEMBL | ChEMBL2288884 |
| ChemSpider | 391274 |
| ECHA InfoCard | 100.161.828 |
| KEGG | C10796 |
| PubChem CID | 442971 |
| UNII | 5QOL0LIM81 |
| CompTox Dashboard (EPA) | DTXSID501016601 |
- InChI: InChI=1S/C45H73NO14/c1-19-7-10-28-20(2)31-29(46(28)17-19)16-27-25-9-8-23-15-24(11-13-44(23,5)26(25)12-14-45(27,31)6)57-43-40(60-42-37(53)35(51)33(49)22(4)56-42)38(54)39(30(18-47)58-43)59-41-36(52)34(50)32(48)21(3)55-41/h8,19-22,24-43,47-54H,7,9-18H2,1-6H3/t19-,20+,21-,22-,24-,25+,26-,27-,28+,29-,30+,31-,32-,33-,34+,35+,36+,37+,38-,39+,40+,41-,42-,43+,44-,45-/m0/s1 Key: TYNQWWGVEGFKRU-AJDPQWBVSA-N; InChI=1/C45H73NO14/c1-19-7-10-28-20(2)31-29(46(28)17-19)16-27-25-9-8-23-15-24(11-13-44(23,5)26(25)12-14-45(27,31)6)57-43-40(60-42-37(53)35(51)33(49)22(4)56-42)38(54)39(30(18-47)58-43)59-41-36(52)34(50)32(48)21(3)55-41/h8,19-22,24-43,47-54H,7,9-18H2,1-6H3/t19-,20+,21-,22-,24-,25+,26-,27-,28+,29-,30+,31-,32-,33-,34+,35+,36+,37+,38-,39+,40+,41-,42-,43+,44-,45-/m0/s1 Key: TYNQWWGVEGFKRU-AJDPQWBVBS
- SMILES: O([C@H]8[C@H](O[C@@H]4C/C3=C/C[C@H]2[C@@H]5C[C@@H]1N6[C@@H]([C@@H](C)[C@@H]1[C@@]5(C)CC[C@@H]2[C@@]3(C)CC4)CC[C@H](C)C6)O[C@H](CO)[C@@H](O[C@@H]7O[C@@H](C)[C@H](O)[C@@H](O)[C@H]7O)[C@@H]8O)[C@@H]9O[C@H]([C@H](O)[C@@H](O)[C@H]9O)C; C[C@H]1CC[C@@H]2[C@H]([C@H]3[C@@H](N2C1)C[C@@H]4[C@@]3(CC[C@H]5[C@H]4CC=C6[C@@]5(CC[C@@H](C6)O[C@H]7[C@H]([C@H]([C@H]([C@H](O7)CO)O[C@H]8[C@@H]([C@@H]([C@H]([C@@H](O8)C)O)O)O)O)O[C@H]9[C@@H]([C@@H]([C@@H]([C@@H](O9)C)O)O)O)C)C)C

Properties
| Chemical formula | C_{45}H_{73}NO_{14} |
| Molar mass | 852.072 g·mol^{−1} |
| Melting point | 243 °C (469 °F; 516 K) |

Hazards
- GHS labelling
| Pictograms | (GHS08: Health hazard) (GHS06: Toxic) |
| Signal word | Warning |
| Hazard statements | H361 |
| Precautionary statements | P203, P280, P318, P405, P501 |
- Except where otherwise noted, data are given for materials in their standard state (at 25 °C [77 °F], 100 kPa). verify (what is ?) Infobox references

α-Chaconine is a steroidal glycoalkaloid that occurs in plants of the family Solanaceae. It is a natural toxicant produced in green potatoes and gives the potato a bitter taste. Tubers produce this glycoalkaloid in response to stress, providing the plant with insecticidal and fungicidal properties. It belongs to the chemical family of saponins. Since it causes physiological effects on individual organism, chaconine is considered to be a defensive allelochemical. Solanine, a related substance also found in potatoes, has similar properties.

== Symptoms and treatment ==
Symptoms resemble those seen following solanine ingestion including abdominal pain, diarrhea, and headache.

There is currently no antidote for detoxification but if it is just after consumption, taking laxatives or gastric lavage could be effective. The symptoms could last several days.

== Toxicity ==
The presence of more than 20 mg/100 g tuber glycoalkaloids is toxic for humans.

There have been instances of fatal poisoning cases from potatoes with high glycoalkaloid content. However, such cases are rare.

Some research shows teratogenic effects on humans, but epidemiological investigations have produced conflicting research, as well. Levels of glycoalkaloids most likely differ by cultivar, storage conditions (especially exposure to sunlight), and processing techniques.

== Difference from solanine ==
=== Structural difference ===
Although α-chaconine and α-solanine are both derived from solanidine, the difference appears in 3 groups attached to the terminal oxygen in solanidine. For α-chaconine, these groups are one D-glucose and two L-rhamnose whereas in α-solanine, they are D-galactose, D-glucose, and L-rhamnose.

=== Difference in toxicity ===
In an experiment demonstrating the feeding-inhibition effect of solanine and chaconine on snails, chaconine had a greater effect than solanine. However, a mixture of chaconine and solanine had a synergistic effect. The mixture had a significantly higher effect of deterred feeding than using solanine and chaconine on their own.

=== Ratio of ɑ-chaconine to ɑ-solanine in potato ===
On average, it is between 1.2 and 2.6 to 1, meaning the amount of ɑ-chaconine is greater than ɑ-solanine. However, the average ratio for the peel was 2.0 whereas that for the flesh was nearly 1.5. Also, the ratio was not consistent and depended on cultivar, growth condition, and method of storage.

== Research on glycoalkaloids ==
=== Controlling the amount of steroidal glycoalkaloids in potatoes ===
In 2014, a research group in Japan from the Institute of Physical and Chemical Research (or RIKEN) found genes for enzymes that are involved in the synthesis of cholesterol, cycloartanol, and related steroidal glycoalkaloids (SGAs), SSR2. Since SGAs are biosynthesized from cholesterol, restricting those enzymes could reduce the amount of the SGAs in potato.

=== Level of glycoalkaloids ===
The research studied the effects of different cooking techniques on the amount of glycoalkaloids (containing more than 90% of both solanine and chaconine). The techniques studied were boiling, baking, frying, and microwaving. The research found that fried peel has the largest amount of glycoalkaloids (139–145 mg/100 g of product), whereas potatoes prepared with other methods contained an average amount of 3 mg/100 g product.

Another research found the amount of SGAs is unaffected by baking, boiling, and frying. This research also showed very high level of SGAs with non-peeled potato tubers (200 mg kg^{−1} FM).

In 2004, one study that investigated the change in the amount of α-chaconine and α-solanine over 90 days. The result showed how the amount of both α-chaconine and α-solanine did not change significantly if it is kept in a cold and dark place. While the amount varied slightly, the research concluded that it is due to the cultivar.

=== Treating poisons in potato ===
Peels and sprouts usually contain high level of SGAs. Relatively larger amounts can be found if the tuber is exposed to sunlight. If tubers are not matured enough, those might contain high level of chaconine and solanine. Thus, sprouts on potato and peels should be removed and if there are green parts inside the potato, it should be removed as well. It should be preserved in a dark and cold place, but it does not have to be in the fridge. It is likely to germinate or degrade when the surrounding is above 20 °C. Heating might not be very effective towards SGAs, therefore, those contain high level of SGAs should be carefully removed. Also, if potatoes are kept in a fridge, it increases the amount of sugar. When cooked, such as frying or baking, acrylamide can form.

When cooking potatoes, if it is fried at 210 °C for 10 minutes, the amount of solanine and chaconine is reduced to 60% of the original amount. If it is fried at 170 °C for 5 minutes, there was no significant change in the amount of solanine and chaconine. However, if it is fried for 15 minutes at the same temperature, solanine decreased to 76.1% and chaconine decreased to 81.5%. Thus, the break down of solanine and chaconine are considered to start around 170 °C. In another study, a solution containing α-solanine and α-chaconine is put into boiling water for 150 minutes. The study found no significant decrease in the amount of solanine and chaconine. Therefore, it can be considered that boiling potato is not effective to reduce the amount of solanine and chaconine.

Also, since glycoalkaloids are soluble in water, soaking potatoes in water may cause SGAs to dissolve into the water.

=== Attempts to make toxin-free potato ===
Research was launched in 2015 attempting to make potatoes with no glycoalkaloids by genome editing. Because glycoalkaloids heavily affect human health, it is necessary to test for the amount present in potatoes, an expense that would be saved if a glycoalkaloid-free potato were available, in addition to being a more healthy food.

Part of the research involves trying to determine what advantage potatoes achieve from producing glycoalkaloids. Research has been published suggesting that potatoes benefit little from the production of glycoalkaloids, though other research have questioned that conclusion.

== See also ==
- Solamargine
