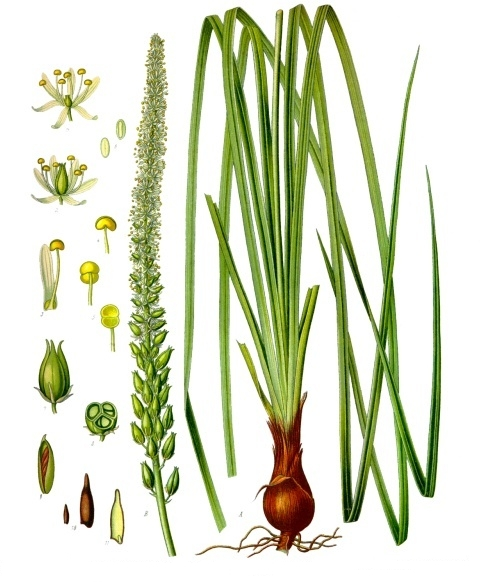
- Botanical illustration
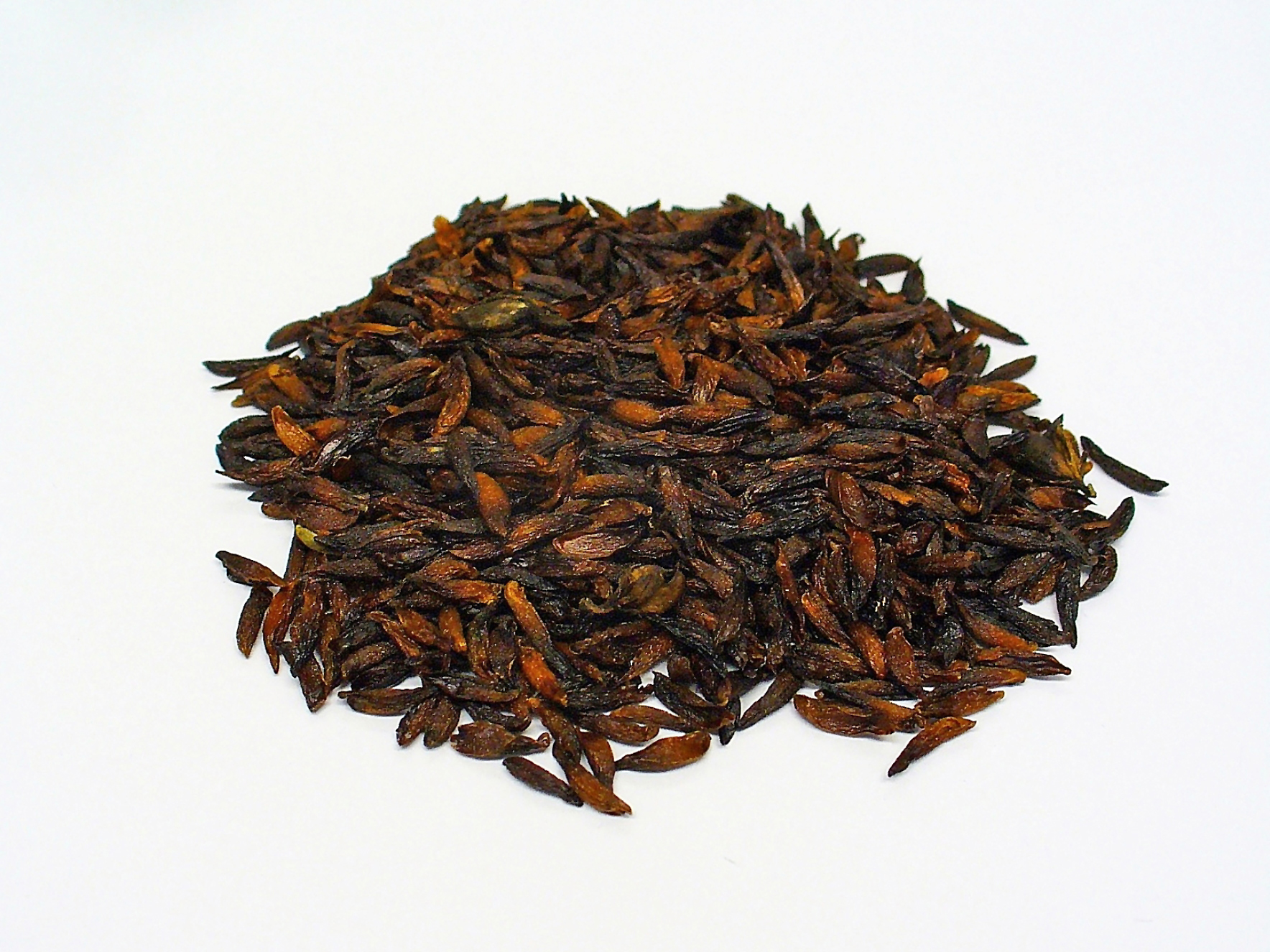
- Seeds

Scientific classification
- Kingdom: Plantae
- Clade: Tracheophytes
- Clade: Angiosperms
- Clade: Monocots
- Order: Liliales
- Family: Melanthiaceae
- Genus: Schoenocaulon
- Species: S. officinale

Binomial name
- Schoenocaulon officinale (Schltdl. & Cham.) A.Gray

Synonyms
- List: Asagraea caracasana Ernst; Asagraea officinalis (Schltdl. & Cham.) Lindl.; Asagraea sabadilla (Retz.) A.Lyons; Helonias officinalis (Schltdl. & Cham.) D.Don; Melanthium sabadilla (Retz.) Thunb.; Sabadilla officinalis (Schltdl. & Cham.) Standl.; Sabadilla officinarum Brandt & Ratzeb.; Skoinolon officinale (Schltdl. & Cham.) Farw.; Veratrum officinale Schltdl. & Cham.; Veratrum sabadilla Retz.; Xerophyllum sabadilla (Retz.) D.Don ex G.Don

= Schoenocaulon officinale =

Species of flowering plant

Schoenocaulon officinale, called sabadilla, is a species of flowering plant in the genus Schoenocaulon, native to Mexico, Central America, and Venezuela. It is highly toxic, containing veratridine, cevadine, and other alkaloids. Its seeds were used by pharmacists around the world to prepare delousing solutions and insecticides. It is still collected and used locally to rid domestic animals of fleas, ticks, lice and other parasites, and attempts are being made to revive the industry.
