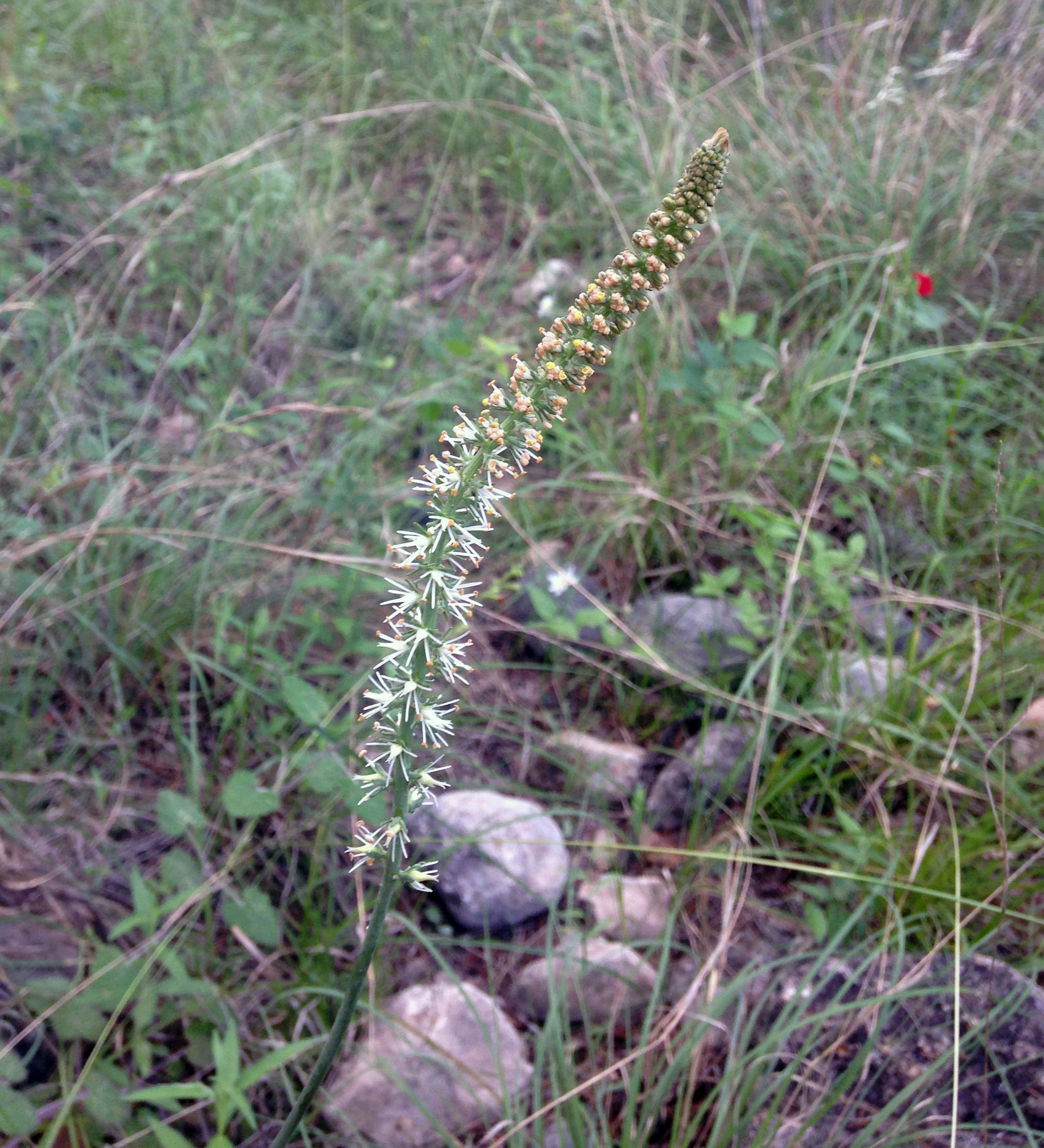

Scientific classification
- Kingdom: Plantae
- Clade: Tracheophytes
- Clade: Angiosperms
- Clade: Monocots
- Order: Liliales
- Family: Melanthiaceae
- Genus: Schoenocaulon
- Species: S. texanum

Binomial name
- Schoenocaulon texanum Scheele

= Schoenocaulon texanum =

Species of flowering plant

Schoenocaulon texanum, commonly called Texas feathershank, is a species of flowering plant in the bunchflower family (Melanthiaceae). It is native to North America, where it is found in the states of Chihuahua, Coahuila, Durango, and San Luis Potosí in Mexico; and in New Mexico and Texas in the United States.

Its natural habitat is in dry, calcareous, rocky grasslands and open scrubby woodlands.

Schoenocaulon texanum is an herbaceous bulbous perennial. Its leaves are basal and grass-like. Its inflorescence is a long, compact spike. It typically flowers in late spring and early summer, although later season flowering can be induced by rainfall.
