= Solanidine =

Names
- IUPAC name Solanid-5-en-3β-ol
- Systematic IUPAC name (2S,4aR,4bS,6aS,6bR,7S,7aR,10S,12aS,13aS,13bS)-4a,6a,7,10-Tetramethyl-2,3,4,4a,4b,5,6,6a,6b,7,7a,8,9,10,11,12a,13,13a,13b,14-icosahydro-1H-naphtho[2′,1′:4,5]indeno[1,2-b]indolizin-2-ol
- Other names Solatubin; Solatubine

Identifiers
CAS Number	80-78-4
3D model (JSmol)	Interactive image; Interactive image
Beilstein Reference	45370
ChEBI	CHEBI:28374
ChEMBL	ChEMBL1980466
ChemSpider	59150
ECHA InfoCard	100.001.191
EC Number	201-309-5
KEGG	C06543
PubChem CID	65727
UNII	W7801OHM8B
CompTox Dashboard (EPA)	DTXSID701018960
- InChI: InChI=1S/C27H43NO/c1-16-5-8-23-17(2)25-24(28(23)15-16)14-22-20-7-6-18-13-19(29)9-11-26(18,3)21(20)10-12-27(22,25)4/h6,16-17,19-25,29H,5,7-15H2,1-4H3/t16-,17+,19-,20+,21-,22-,23+,24-,25-,26-,27-/m0/s1 Key: JVKYZPBMZPJNAJ-OQFNDJACSA-N; InChI=1/C27H43NO/c1-16-5-8-23-17(2)25-24(28(23)15-16)14-22-20-7-6-18-13-19(29)9-11-26(18,3)21(20)10-12-27(22,25)4/h6,16-17,19-25,29H,5,7-15H2,1-4H3/t16-,17+,19-,20+,21-,22-,23+,24-,25-,26-,27-/m0/s1 Key: JVKYZPBMZPJNAJ-OQFNDJACBI
- SMILES: C[C@H]1CC[C@@H]2[C@H]([C@H]3[C@@H](N2C1)C[C@@H]4[C@@]3(CC[C@H]5[C@H]4CC=C6[C@@]5(CC[C@@H](C6)O)C)C)C; C[C@@H]1CN2[C@@]3([H])C[C@@]4([H])[C@]5([H])CCC6=C[C@@H](O)CC[C@]6(C)[C@@]5([H])CC[C@]4(C)[C@@]3([H])[C@H](C)[C@@]2([H])CC1

Properties
Chemical formula	C_{27}H_{43}NO
Molar mass	397.647 g·mol^{−1}

Hazards
- GHS labelling
Pictograms	(GHS07: Exclamation mark)
Signal word	Warning
Hazard statements	H302, H413
Precautionary statements	P264, P270, P273, P301+P312, P330, P501
- Except where otherwise noted, data are given for materials in their standard state (at 25 °C [77 °F], 100 kPa). Infobox references

Solanidine is a poisonous steroidal alkaloid chemical compound that occurs in plants of the family Solanaceae, such as potato and Solanum americanum. The sugar portion of glycoalkaloids hydrolyses in the body, leaving the solanidine portion.

== Occurrence ==
Solanidine is the hydrolyzed form of several naturally occurring compounds all found in the Solanaceae family, such as glycoalkaloids, α-solanine and α-chaconine. Solanidine is not commonly found in nature, but precursors to it are. Glycoalkaloids are one of the toxins present in Solanum dulcamara and can be found in other Solanum plants as well such as potatoes, tomatoes and eggplant. Solanine is also found in all parts of the Solanum family species and is considered part of the plant's natural defenses. Chaconine is found in specifically green tubers and gives them their bitter taste. Solanidine is found naturally occurring in green potatoes and in the Solanum americanum species. The theorized biosynthetic route for the creation of Solanidine proposed in 1977 within the Solanaceae family was thought to be derived from cholesterol to the SA aglycone. This pathway was overturned in 2013 when a set of glycoalkaloid metabolism genes was found present in Solanaceae plants that participate in a SGA biosynthesis pathway.

== Poisoning symptoms ==
Solanidine occurs in the blood serum of normal healthy people who eat potato, and serum solanidine levels fall markedly once potato consumption ceases. Solanidine from food is also stored in the human body for prolonged periods of time, and it has been suggested that it could be released during times of metabolic stress with the potential for deleterious consequences. Solanidine is responsible for neuromuscular syndromes via cholinesterase inhibition. Symptoms of cholinesterase inhibition include insomnia, nausea and vomiting, accidental injury, headache, dizziness, bradycardia, hypotension, ecchymosis, and sleep disturbance. Solanidine poisoning is rarely fatal, but can in very severe cases cause coma and death.

== Uses ==
=== Solanidine to DPA synthesis ===
Solanidine is a very important precursor for the synthesis of hormones and some pharmacologically active compounds. The idea to utilize Solanidine as a starting material came from a desire to utilize wasted potato glycoalkaloids from potato farming. It was found a successful starting material for the creation of steroid hormones, such as 16-DPA, which is a common intermediate found in industry synthesis of progesterone and cortisone derivatives. The final reaction consisted of nine steps to get from Solanidine to DPA with a 30% yield.

=== Solanidine as a biomarker for CYP2D6 activity ===
Solanidine was found to have a strong biomarker in relation to the varied cytochrome gene CYP2D6. Due to its natural variance CYP2D6 can affect the efficiency and safety of common medicines such as antidepressants and antipsychotics. Solanidine was first found to be a biomarker in 2014 and was found in high concentrations in CYP2D6 poor metabolizers as well as in patients utilizing CYP2D6 inhibitors compared with rapid metabolizers. Using paroxetine, a CYP2D6 inhibitor, 95% of solanidine metabolism was stopped. Since consumption of potatoes is so common, solanidine can be used as a biomarker when studying CYP2D6 drug-drug interactions and improve CYP2D6 activity prediction.

=== Solanidine to 16-DPA conversion ===
Electrochemical oxidation of Solanidine:

In 1994, Gunic and coworkers reported the electrochemical oxidation of 3β-acetoxy-solanidine in CH_{3}CN/CH_{2}Cl_{2} 1/1 with pyridine as a base. The corresponding iminium salts 2 and 3 were obtained in a 1/1 ratio in good yield. Performing this electrochemical reaction in DCM with pyridine gives 3 in 95% yield, while the same reaction in acetone gives iminium salt 2 in 95% yield. Iminium ion 2 can be isomerized to the thermodynamically more stable enamine 5. THis isomerization is believed to proceed via enamine 4, which is the kinetic product.

Solanidine to 16-DPA conversion:

In 1997, Gaši et al. reported a short procedure for the degradation of solanidine to 16-Dehydropregnenolone acetate. Instead of applying the electrochemical oxidation, Hg(OAc)_{2} in acetone was used as oxidizing agent. The advantage of this reagent and solvent system was the ease of use and the selective formation of iminium salt 2, which spontaneously isomerized to enamine 3 (94%). This enamine was then subjected to another isomerization, which yielded the more thermodynamically more stable enamine 4. NaIO_{4}-oxidation opened up the cyclic enamine and gave lactam 5. Elimination of the lactam part with Al_{2}O_{3} in benzene afforded in 34% 16-dehydropregnenolone acetate (DPA) (6). Using K_{2}CO_{3} in benzene followed by reacetylation produced 6 in a lower yield (11%).

=== Solanidine to tomatidenol conversion ===
Solanidine von Braun reaction

In 1968, Beisler and Sato synthesized tomatidenol from solanidine, and reported the successful opening of the E ring of solanidine via the von Braun reaction. Only in case of acetylated solanidine the von Braun reaction gave the E ring-opened product in 78% yield.

Schramm reaction

Treatment of α-bromine with KOAc gave in good yield the β-diacetate, which could be reduced with red-Al in benzene.

Schreiber reaction:

These types of compounds can be ringclosed to spirosolane compounds as shown by Schreiber.

== See also ==
- Solasodine
