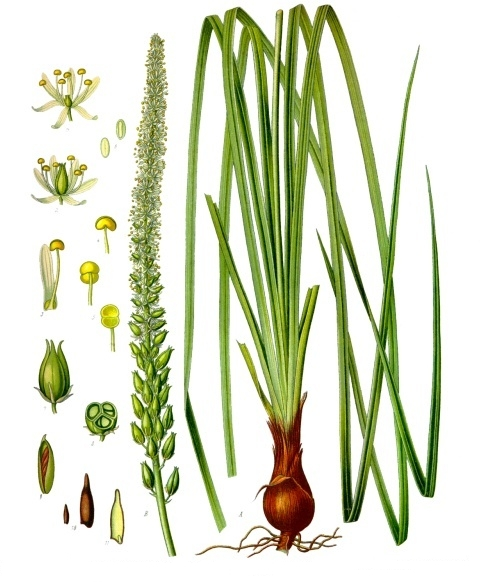
- Schoenocaulon officinale

Scientific classification
- Kingdom: Plantae
- Clade: Tracheophytes
- Clade: Angiosperms
- Clade: Monocots
- Order: Liliales
- Family: Melanthiaceae
- Tribe: Melanthieae
- Genus: Schoenocaulon; A.Gray

Synonyms
- Sabadilla Brandt & Ratzeb.; Skoinolon Raf.; Asagraea Lindl.

= Schoenocaulon =

Genus of flowering plants

Schoenocaulon is a North American genus of perennial herbaceous flowering plants, ranging from the southern United States to Peru. It is a member of the Melanthiaceae, according to the APG III classification system, and is placed in the tribe Melanthieae. Unlike other genera in the tribe, the flowers are arranged in a spike; depending on the species the flower stalks for each flower are either very short or completely absent. Feathershank is a common name, the medicinally used S. officinale is called Sabadilla (pronunciation: /sab-uh-dil-uh/, IPA: /ˌsæb əˈdɪl ə/).

Plants generally grow in chaparral, oak, or pine forests. Grazing has narrowed the natural ranges of some species to only steep, rocky terrain. Mexico is the center of Schoenocaulon diversity, with 22 endemic species - some with distributions limited to single mountain ranges. The two species with the widest distributions, S. yucatanense (sometimes treated as part of S. ghiesbreghtii) and S. officinale (sabadilla), may have been spread by pre-Columbians who used the seeds as pesticides.

The petal and sepal color varies by species, with some shade of green being most common, but with maroon, cream, and bright red also represented.

species

- Schoenocaulon calcicola - Oaxaca
- Schoenocaulon caricifolium - Tamaulipas
- Schoenocaulon comatum - San Luis Potosí, Puebla, Oaxaca
- Schoenocaulon conzattii - Oaxaca
- Schoenocaulon dubium - Florida
- Schoenocaulon frameae - Puebla
- Schoenocaulon ghiesbreghtii - S Texas to Veracruz
- Schoenocaulon ignigenum - Tamaulipas, Nuevo León
- Schoenocaulon intermedium - San Luis Potosí, Hidalgo
- Schoenocaulon jaliscense - Jalisco, Oaxaca
- Schoenocaulon macrocarpum - Tamaulipas, Nuevo León
- Schoenocaulon madidorum - Veracruz, Puebla, Oaxaca
- Schoenocaulon megarrhizum - Chihuahua, Sonora, Sinaloa
- Schoenocaulon mortonii - México State, Jalisco, Michoacán
- Schoenocaulon oaxacense - Oaxaca
- Schoenocaulon obtusum - Hidalgo, México State
- Schoenocaulon officinale - C + S Mexico, Central America, Venezuela - sabadilla
- Schoenocaulon pellucidum - Nayarit
- Schoenocaulon plumosum - Coahuila, Nuevo León, Tamaulipas
- Schoenocaulon pringlei - Hidalgo, Veracruz, México State, D.F.
- Schoenocaulon rzedowskii - Mexico, Puebla
- Schoenocaulon tenorioi - Oaxaca, Puebla
- Schoenocaulon tenue - Morelos
- Schoenocaulon tenuifolium - Oaxaca, Puebla
- Schoenocaulon texanum - New Mexico, Texas, Chihuahua, Coahuila, Nuevo León
- Schoenocaulon tigrense - Jalisco
