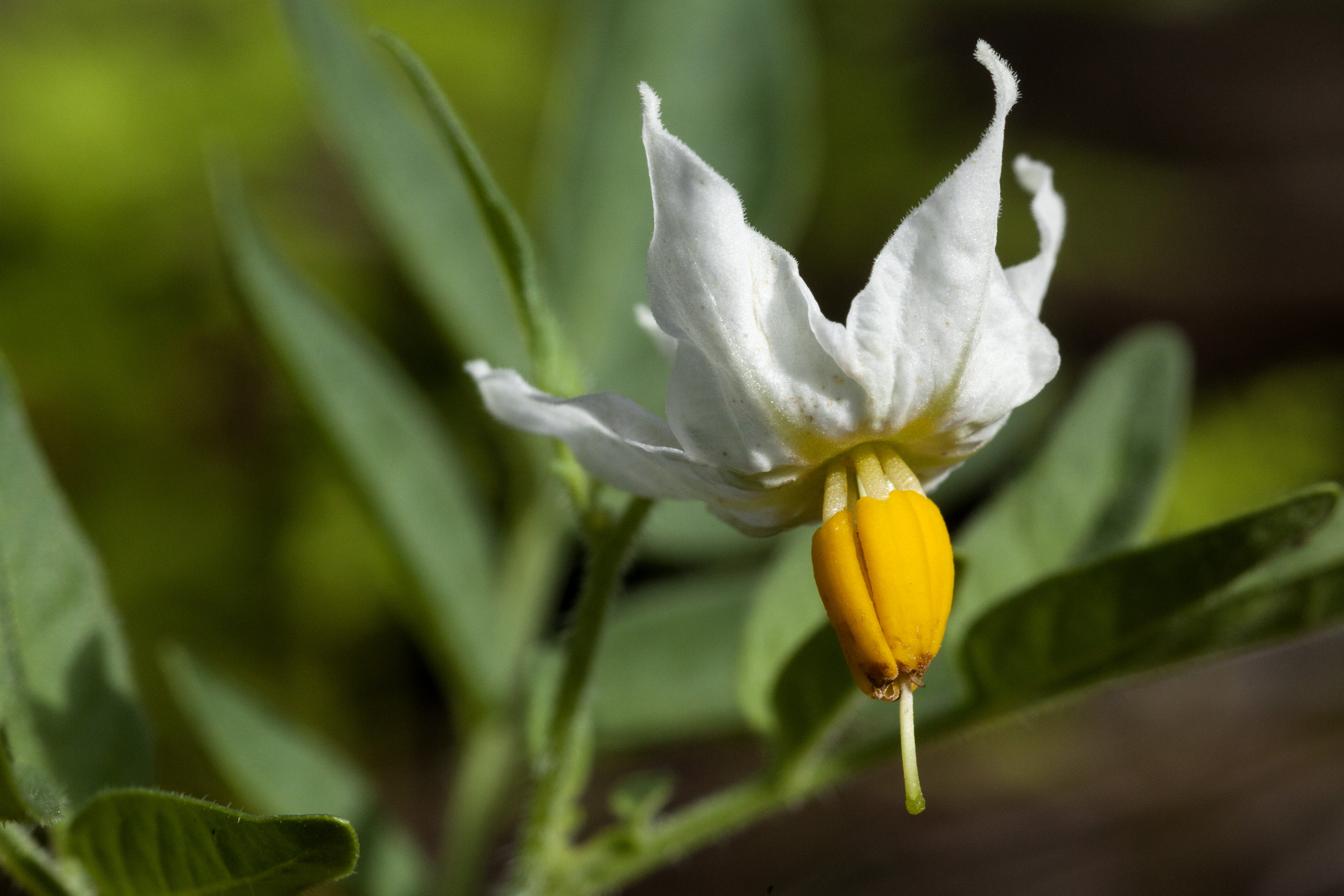

Scientific classification
- Kingdom: Plantae
- Clade: Tracheophytes
- Clade: Angiosperms
- Clade: Eudicots
- Clade: Asterids
- Order: Solanales
- Family: Solanaceae
- Genus: Solanum
- Species: S. jamesii

Binomial name
- Solanum jamesii Torr.

= Solanum jamesii =

Species of plant

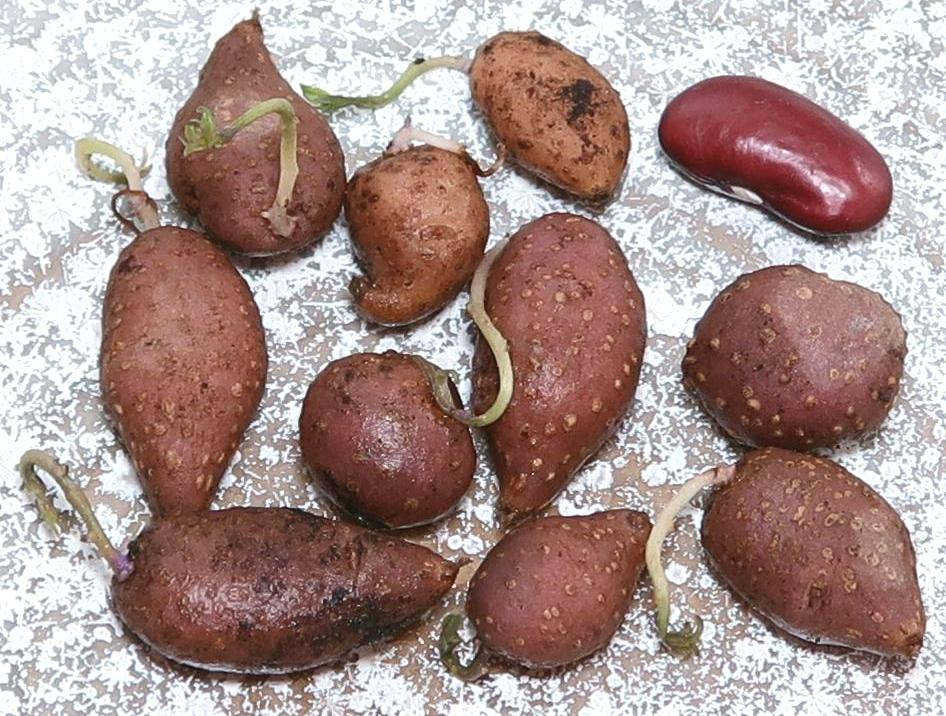
Tubers of Solanum jamesii (with red bean for scale)

Solanum jamesii (common names: wild potato or Four Corners potato) is a species of nightshade. Its range includes the southern United States. All parts of the plant, and especially the fruit, are toxic, containing solanine when it matures. The tubers were/are eaten raw or cooked by several Native American tribes, but they require leaching and boiling in clay in order to be rendered edible. The tubers are small when compared to familiar varieties of S. tuberosum.

Escalante Valley in Utah boasts the oldest archaeologically documented cultivation sites of the Four Corners potato, dating back over 7,000 years, and the plant is so prevalent there that a former name for the area was "Potato Valley". S. jamesii is sometimes grown in yards or gardens as an ornamental plant, and there have been recent experiments in Escalante, Utah to start growing it as a food vegetable again, making use of the lower-alkaloid cultivars selected by the natives. According to cultivariable.com, "The primary glycoalkaloid in this species is tomatine, unlike the domesticated potato, in which the primary glycoalkaloids are solanine and chaconine."
