= Tomatidine =

Names
- IUPAC name (1R,2S,4S,5′S,6S,7S,8R,9S,12S,13S,16S,18S)-5′,7,9,13-tetramethylspiro[5-oxapentacyclo[10.8.0.0^{2,9}.0^{4,8}.0_{13,18}]icosane-6,2′-piperidine]-16-ol
- Other names: 5alpha-Tomatidan-3beta-ol; (3beta,5alpha,22beta,25S)-Spirosolan-3-ol; Tomatidin; (22S,25S)-5alpha-spirosolan-3beta-ol

Identifiers
CAS Number	77-59-8; 6192-62-7
3D model (JSmol)	Interactive image
Beilstein Reference	91747
ChEBI	CHEBI:9629
ChEMBL	ChEMBL2165711
ChemSpider	59019
ECHA InfoCard	100.000.947
EC Number	201-040-3
KEGG	C10826
PubChem CID	65576
UNII	2B73S48786
CompTox Dashboard (EPA)	DTXSID0037102
- InChI: InChI=1S/C27H45NO2/c1-16-7-12-27(28-15-16)17(2)24-23(30-27)14-22-20-6-5-18-13-19(29)8-10-25(18,3)21(20)9-11-26(22,24)4/h16-24,28-29H,5-15H2,1-4H3/t16-,17-,18-,19-,20+,21-,22-,23-,24-,25-,26-,27-/m0/s1 Key: XYNPYHXGMWJBLV-VXPJTDKGSA-N
- SMILES: CC1CCC2(C(C3C(O2)CC4C3(CCC5C4CCC6C5(CCC(C6)O)C)C)C)NC1

Properties
Chemical formula	C_{27}H_{45}NO_{2}
Molar mass	415.662 g·mol^{−1}

Hazards
- GHS labelling
Pictograms	(GHS06: Toxic) (GHS07: Exclamation mark)
Signal word	Danger
Hazard statements	H301, H302, H331
Precautionary statements	P261, P264, P270, P271, P301+P310, P301+P312, P304+P340, P311, P321, P330, P403+P233, P405, P501
- Except where otherwise noted, data are given for materials in their standard state (at 25 °C [77 °F], 100 kPa). Infobox references

Tomatidine is a natural compound found in leaves of tomatoes and green tomatoes. Chemically, it is the aglycone of tomatine. It has been shown to have potential health benefits in animal models. For instance, tomatidine inhibited skeletal muscle atrophy in a mouse model of skeletal unloading-induced atrophy and to prevent or reverse sarcopenia (loss of muscle mass and strength due to biological aging) by inhibiting the activation of genes by ATF4.

Dietary supplementation with ~0.04% tomatidine for 10 weeks reduced plasma cholesterol and atherosclerosis in ApoE-deficient mice without evidence of toxicity.

== Research ==
It is investigated as compound to increase longevity and it increased lifespan and healthspan of C. elegans. It is also investigated in osteoporosis.

== See also ==
- Ursolic acid
