= Digoxigenin =

Names
- IUPAC name 3β,12β,14-Trihydroxy-5β-card-20(22)-enolide
- Systematic IUPAC name 4-[(1R,3aS,3bR,5aR,7S,9aS,9bS,11R,11aS)-3a,7,11-Trihydroxy-9a,11a-dimethylhexadecahydro-1H-cyclopenta[a]phenanthren-1-yl]furan-2(5H)-one

Identifiers
CAS Number	1672-46-4
ChEBI	CHEBI:42098
ChEMBL	ChEMBL1153
ChemSpider	14728
ECHA InfoCard	100.015.279
PubChem CID	15478
UNII	NQ1SX9LNAU
CompTox Dashboard (EPA)	DTXSID6051778
- InChI: InChI=1S/C23H34O5/c1-21-7-5-15(24)10-14(21)3-4-17-18(21)11-19(25)22(2)16(6-8-23(17,22)27)13-9-20(26)28-12-13/h9,14-19,24-25,27H,3-8,10-12H2,1-2H3/t14-,15+,16-,17-,18+,19-,21+,22+,23+/m1/s1 Key: SHIBSTMRCDJXLN-KCZCNTNESA-N; InChI=1/C23H34O5/c1-21-7-5-15(24)10-14(21)3-4-17-18(21)11-19(25)22(2)16(6-8-23(17,22)27)13-9-20(26)28-12-13/h9,14-19,24-25,27H,3-8,10-12H2,1-2H3/t14-,15+,16-,17-,18+,19-,21+,22+,23+/m1/s1 Key: SHIBSTMRCDJXLN-KCZCNTNEBN

Properties
Chemical formula	C_{23}H_{34}O_{5}
Molar mass	390.51 g/mol
log P	2.57510
- Except where otherwise noted, data are given for materials in their standard state (at 25 °C [77 °F], 100 kPa). verify (what is ?) Infobox references

Digoxigenin (DIG) is a steroid found exclusively in the flowers and leaves of the plants Digitalis purpurea, Digitalis orientalis and Digitalis lanata (foxgloves), where it is attached to sugars, to form the glycosides (e.g. digoxin, lanatoside C).

== Uses in biotechnology ==
Digoxigenin is a hapten, a small molecule with high antigenicity, that is used in many molecular biology applications similarly to other popular haptens such as 2,4-Dinitrophenol, biotin, and fluorescein. Typically, digoxigenin is introduced chemically (conjugation) into biomolecules (proteins, nucleic acids) to be detected in further assays. K_{d} of the digoxigenin-antibody interaction has been estimated at ~12 nM (compare to K_{d}~0.1pM for the biotin-streptavidin interaction).

DIG-binding proteins

Tinberg et al. designed artificial proteins that bind DIG. Their best binder, DIG10.3, was a 141 amino acid protein that bound DIG with a dissociation constant (K_{d}) of 541 (+/- 193) pM.

Anti-digoxigenin antibodies with high affinities and specificity are used in a variety of biological immuno-assays (e.g. ELISA). The antibodies are labeled with dyes, enzymes or fluorescence, directly or secondarily, for visualization and detection.

Digoxigenin is thus an all-purpose immuno-tag, and in particular a standard immunohistochemical marker for in situ hybridization. In this case it is conjugated to a single species of RNA nucleoside triphosphate (typically uridine), which is then incorporated into RNA (a "riboprobe") as it is synthesized by the cellular machinery.

It allows to make :

- sensitive non-radioactive in situ hybridization probes to detect nucleic acids in plants, able to detect 1 μg of plasmid DNA.
- peptide-DIG conjugates, i.e. bradykinin assay by very sensitive chemiluminescence immunoassays.
- fluorescent and DIG-labeled tracers for competitive immunoassays, i.e. to limit detect digoxin, a drug used to cure cardiac arrhythmia, down to 0.2 ng mL^{−1}.
- Digoxigenin may be conjugated to sugars to study glycosylation events, even in biological systems.

== See also ==
- Immunostaining
