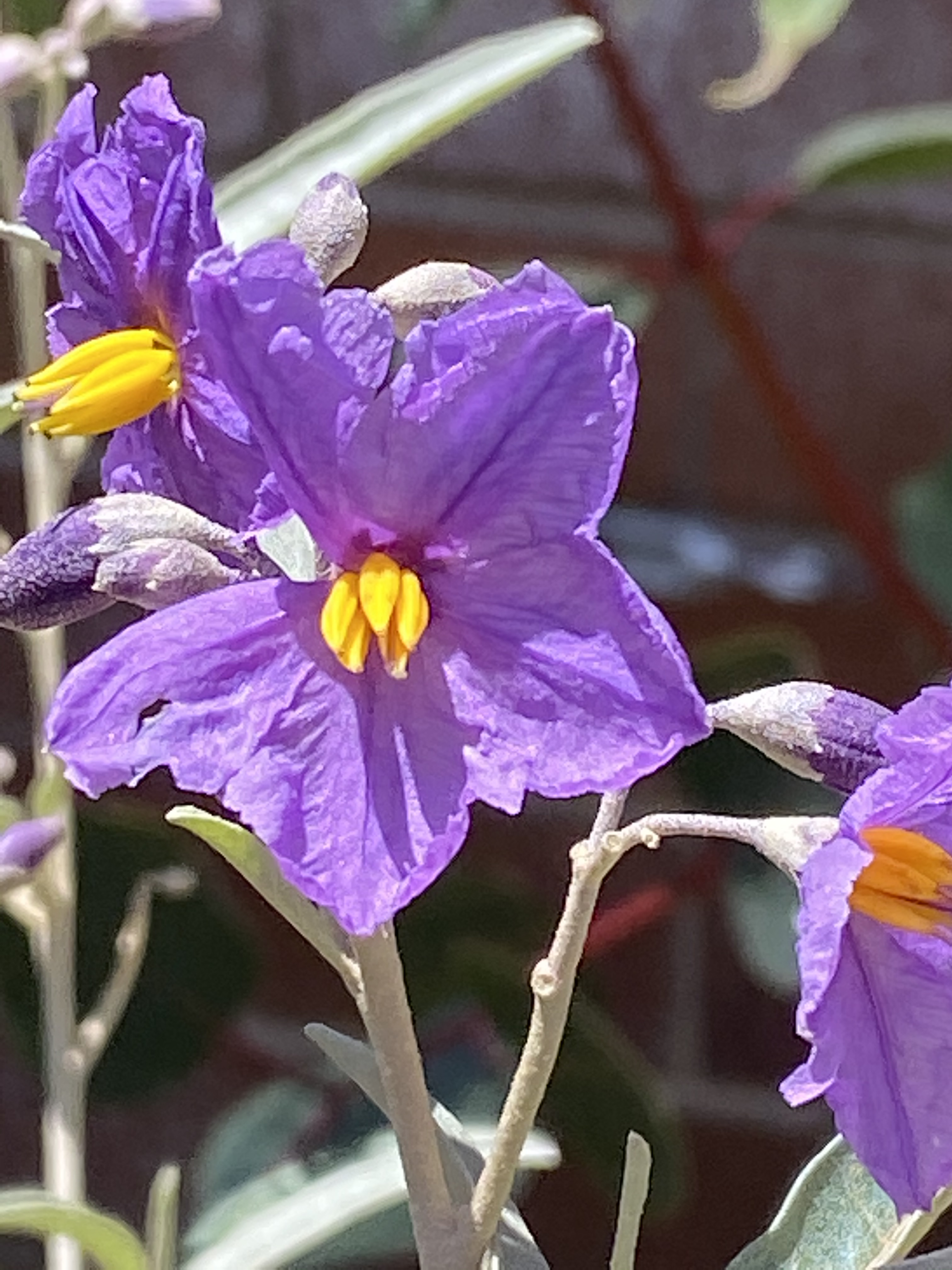
- A flowering Sturts Nightshade

Scientific classification
- Kingdom: Plantae
- Clade: Embryophytes
- Clade: Tracheophytes
- Clade: Angiosperms
- Clade: Eudicots
- Clade: Asterids
- Order: Solanales
- Family: Solanaceae
- Genus: Solanum
- Species: S. sturtianum

Binomial name
- Solanum sturtianum F.Muell.
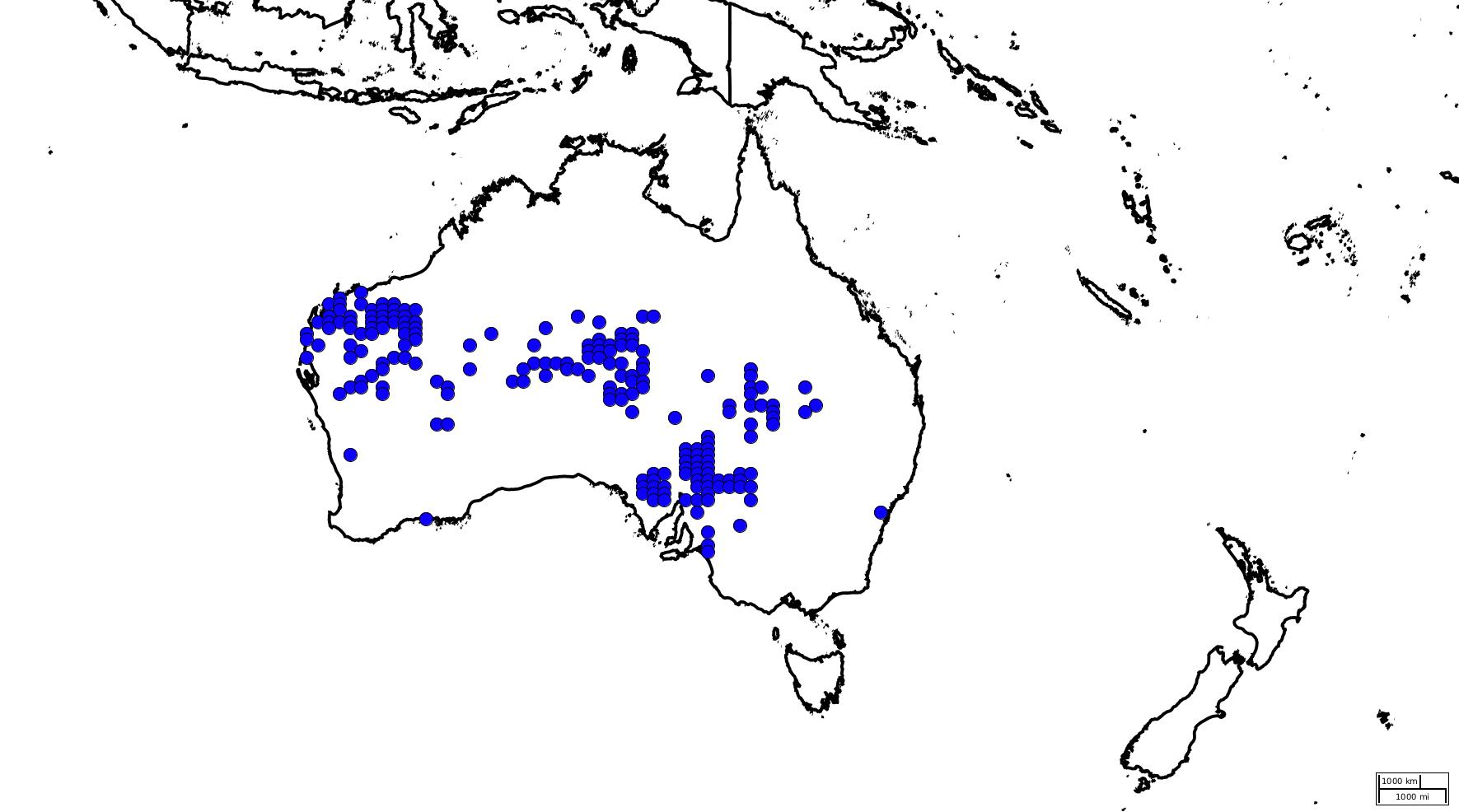
- Distribution map of Sturt's Nightshade from the AVH

= Solanum sturtianum =

Species of plant

Solanum sturtianum, commonly known as Sturt’s nightshade or Thargomindah nightshade, is a flowering plant from the Solanaceae (nightshade) family. Distinct by its purple flowers and dark-black fruits, it is a shrub endemic to the arid zones of mainland Australia.

== Description ==
A highly distinctive perennial shrub by its silvery-green foliage and bright purple flowers. It averages a height of 1 m (3 ft 3 in) but can grow up to 3 m (9.8 ft). It is found in groups known as colonies connected by shallow roots systems of underground rhizomes, which assists in survival in the desert climate due to its nutrient storing ability. These rhizomes essentially create clones of the parent plant to form daughter plants.

The stem and leaves are densely covered with stellate (star-shaped) hairs and prickles scattered over the stem 0.3–0.7 mm (0.012–0.028 in) apart, characteristics of the Solanum genus. It flowers from March through to October with five distinctive purple petals with yellow staminodes and a green central stigma. The leaves appear as elongated spearheads, 30–60 mm (1.2–2.4 in) in length with straight edges and pointed tips. They commonly vary between silvery-green on the adaxial surface and grey-green on the abaxial surface.

The distinctive feature of the S. sturtianum is the dark black dry fruit which is 10–15 mm (0.39–0.59 in) and contains approximately 60 seeds. Each seed is about 3 mm (0.12 in) in length and has a viability of approximately 78% with the ability to stay dormant until there are satisfactory moisture levels in the soil.

== Confusing species ==
Species commonly confused are the S. oligocanthum which has leaves with ridged or teethed edges and lighter fruits and S. elaeagnifolium which again has light brown fruits and hair present on the leaves giving a fuzzy appearance. Both of these are found in the same arid areas of Australia and therefore location can not be a factor used to differentiate between species.

== Taxonomy ==
Solanum is the largest genus in the Solanaceae family containing over 2000 species, with over 70 endemic to Australia. Solanum is from the Latin word meaning to comfort with many plants from this genus used for their medicinal ability. This genus also includes those plants that are commonly used as a food source including the potato, eggplant and tomato.

Solanum sturtianum was first noted by Charles Napier Sturt in 1844 during an exploration across New South Wales and subsequently named sturtianum in honor of and later described by Ferdinand Mueller. S. morrisonii was then later added by botanist David Symon in 1960 and believed to be a closely related species however was later confirmed to be a variation of S. sturtianum.

== Distribution ==
The S. sturtianum is native to Australia. The distribution map emphasizes areas where it has been observed with over 940 recorded observations by the Australasian Virtual Herbarium. The distribution includes the arid zones of most states however there is a notably large presence in Western Australia. This is as to be expected as 26 out of the 70 from the Solanum genus that are endemic to Australia are solely found in Western Australia. It is not present in Victoria however in 2011 there was a singular case on the Victorian border.

The shrub shows a preference for rocky terrain and is common among drainage lines in pastures and other disturbed soil sites. In agricultural areas and along the stock route they are treated as a noxious weed and removed through the use of herbicides.

== Ecology ==
Bees are responsible for 93% of pollination with the Braunsapis and Amegilla the most influential. Solanum are unique lacking open terminal pores and instead have to be milked from the anthers or dug out of terminal pores. These larger bee genera are able to undertake this task more successfully and can vibrate the pollen out with their larger bodies and wings within seconds. Nectar glands appearing on the back of the flower are also used to attract ants and bees, a unique feature to S. sturtianum with most other species non-nectar producing. Sturt's nightshade is also a hermaphrodite meaning the plant has both a stamen and stigma, therefore most bees end up pollinating the same plant. In the event pollination cannot occur and create seed formation the S. sturtianum's ability to clone relieves the selective pressure however limits the variability.

The use of a glycoalkaloid component allows the plant to be better suited to the extreme climate and minimises attacks from herbivores, fungi, bacteria and other pathogens. The extreme bitterness of the plant means its fruit containing the seeds is not a food source and increases its survivability. Its rapid growth rate and ability to form colonies can also repress other plant growth due to the limited resources.

It can grow in a variety of climates but prefers those of the arid zone with gravelly and disturbed soils for seed dispersal ease. An arid zone is classed as an area with a moisture index of lower than 0.4 with an average rainfall of less than 250mm. Hence why seeds have developed the adaption of remaining dormant until sufficient moisture is present for germination.

== Poisoning and toxicity ==
S. sturtianum is extremely toxic to animals when consumed, with most cases seen in sheep and cattle travelling along stock routes. This poisoning occurs through glycoalkaloid, a secondary metabolite found in the plant. Glycoalkaloids play an important role in preventing snails, and other pest species from consuming the leaves and fruit, however they also have subsequent effects on larger grazing animals. The toxin is found predominantly in the unripe fruit which is common to most poisonous members of the Solanum genus. Clinical signs appear in poisoned animals after water consumption. The toxin causes gastrointestinal upset resulting in blood in the faeces, drowsiness, weakness, restlessness, and ultimately death. This can be caused by as little as 400 grams of consumption in sheep and 700 grams in cattle.

== Gallery ==
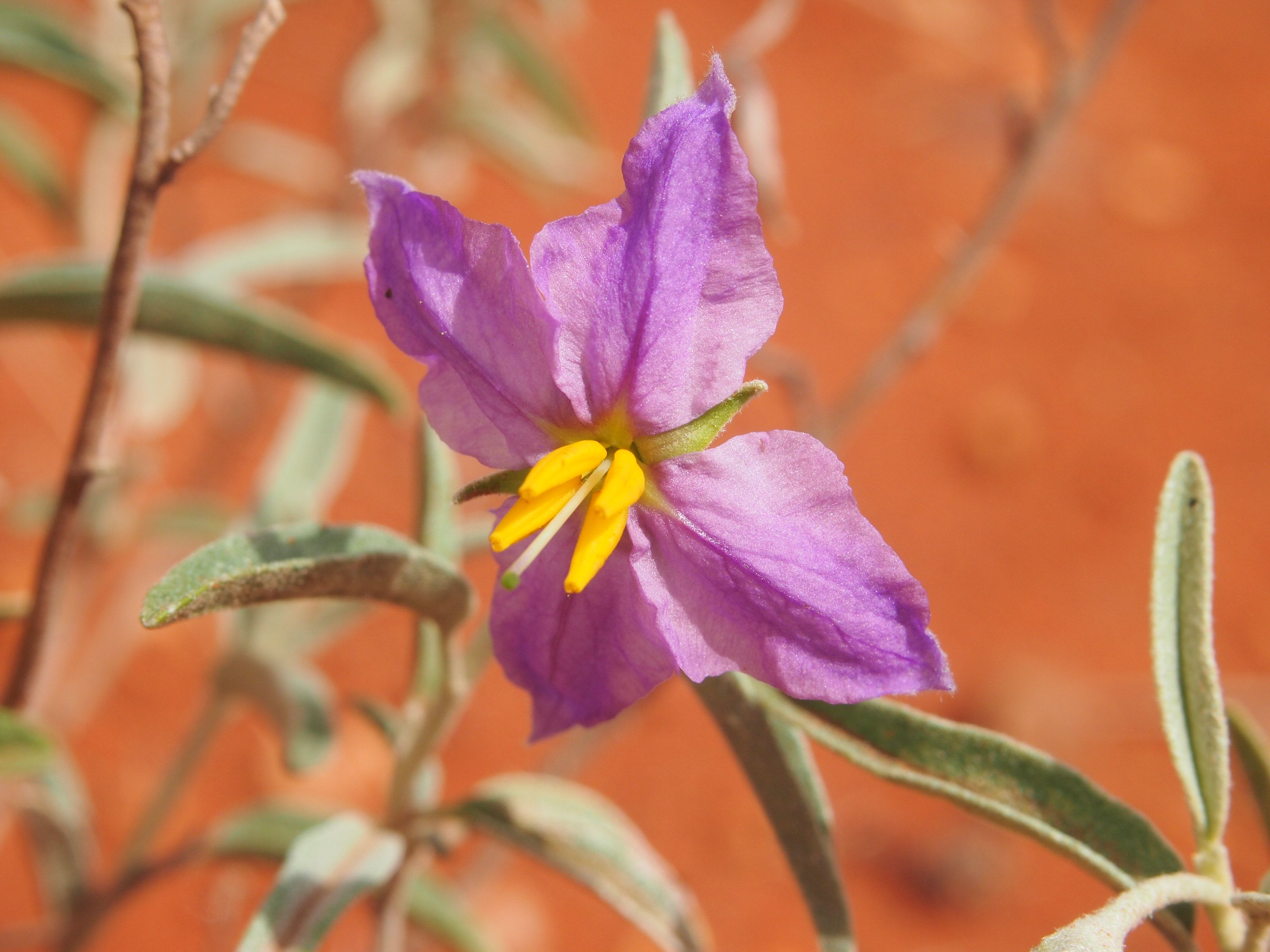

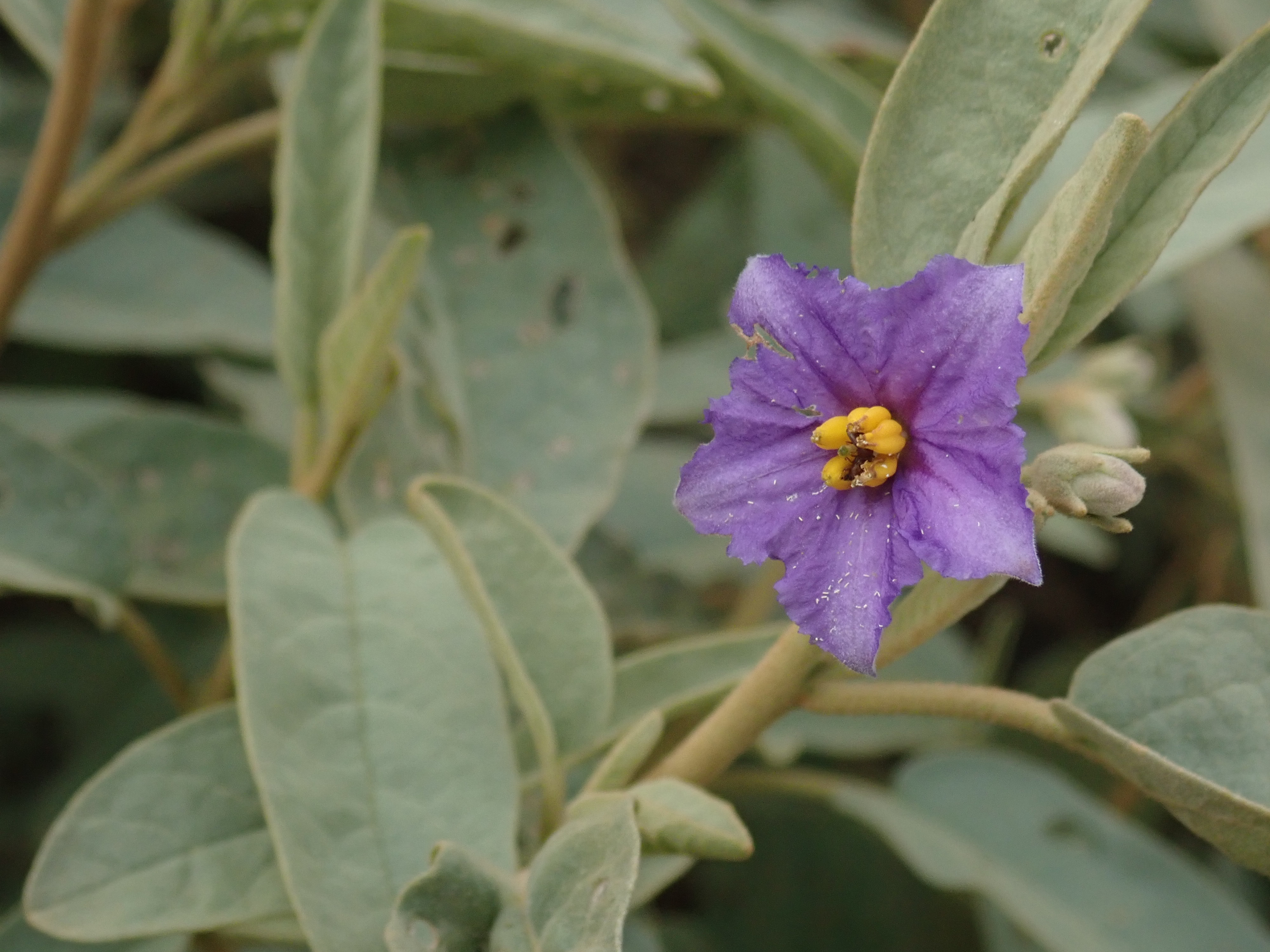
