= Esculeoside A =

Names
- IUPAC name (2aS,2'S,3'S,4S,5'S,6aS,6bS,8aS,8bR,9S,11aS,12bR)-4-(((2R,3R,4R,5R,6R)-3,4-dihydroxy-5-(((2S,3R,4S,5R,6R)-5-hydroxy-6-(hydroxymethyl)-3-(((2S,3R,4S,5S,6R)-3,4,5-trihydroxy-6-(hydroxymethyl)tetrahydro-2H-pyran-2-yl)oxy)-4-(((2S,3R,4S,5R)-3,4,5-trihydroxytetrahydro-2H-pyran-2-yl)oxy)tetrahydro-2H-pyran-2-yl)oxy)-6-(hydroxymethyl)tetrahydro-2H-pyran-2-yl)oxy)-6a,8a,9-trimethyl-5'-((((2R,3R,4S,5S,6R)-3,4,5-trihydroxy-6-(hydroxymethyl)tetrahydro-2H-pyran-2-yl)oxy)methyl)octadecahydrospiro[naphtho[2',1':4,5]indeno[2,1-b]furan-10,2'-piperidin]-3'-yl acetate

Identifiers
CAS Number	532387-86-3
3D model (JSmol)	Interactive image
ChEBI	CHEBI:65866
ChemSpider	9062993
PubChem CID	10887728
UNII	G4UT79K5T5
- InChI: InChI=1S/C58H95NO29/c1-21-36-30(88-58(21)35(79-22(2)64)11-23(14-59-58)19-77-51-45(74)41(70)38(67)31(15-60)81-51)13-28-26-6-5-24-12-25(7-9-56(24,3)27(26)8-10-57(28,36)4)80-53-47(76)43(72)48(34(18-63)84-53)85-55-50(87-54-46(75)42(71)39(68)32(16-61)82-54)49(40(69)33(17-62)83-55)86-52-44(73)37(66)29(65)20-78-52/h21,23-55,59-63,65-76H,5-20H2,1-4H3/t21-,23-,24-,25-,26+,27-,28-,29+,30-,31+,32+,33+,34+,35-,36-,37-,38+,39+,40+,41-,42-,43+,44+,45+,46+,47+,48-,49-,50+,51+,52-,53+,54-,55-,56-,57-,58-/m0/s1 Key: VSQBWNYALURFOT-ZSFCQSFNSA-N; InChI=1/C58H95NO29/c1-21-36-30(88-58(21)35(79-22(2)64)11-23(14-59-58)19-77-51-45(74)41(70)38(67)31(15-60)81-51)13-28-26-6-5-24-12-25(7-9-56(24,3)27(26)8-10-57(28,36)4)80-53-47(76)43(72)48(34(18-63)84-53)85-55-50(87-54-46(75)42(71)39(68)32(16-61)82-54)49(40(69)33(17-62)83-55)86-52-44(73)37(66)29(65)20-78-52/h21,23-55,59-63,65-76H,5-20H2,1-4H3/t21-,23-,24-,25-,26+,27-,28-,29+,30-,31+,32+,33+,34+,35-,36-,37-,38+,39+,40+,41-,42-,43+,44+,45+,46+,47+,48-,49-,50+,51+,52-,53+,54-,55-,56-,57-,58-/m0/s1 Key: VSQBWNYALURFOT-ZSFCQSFNBT
- SMILES: C[C@@]12[C@](CC[C@]3([H])[C@]2([H])CC[C@@]4(C)C3C[C@@]5([H])[C@]4([H])[C@H](C)[C@]6(NC[C@@H](CO[C@H]7[C@H](O)[C@@H](O)[C@H](O)[C@@H](CO)O7)C[C@@H]6OC(C)=O)O5)([H])C[C@@H](O[C@]8([H])O[C@H](CO)[C@H](O[C@@]9([H])[C@H](O[C@@]%10([H])[C@H](O)[C@@H](O)[C@H](O)[C@@H](CO)O%10)[C@@H](O[C@@]%11([H])[C@H](O)[C@@H](O)[C@H](O)CO%11)[C@H](O)[C@@H](CO)O9)[C@H](O)[C@H]8O)CC1

Properties
Chemical formula	C_{58}H_{95}NO_{29}
Molar mass	1270.376 g·mol^{−1}
- Except where otherwise noted, data are given for materials in their standard state (at 25 °C [77 °F], 100 kPa). verify (what is ?) Infobox references

Esculeoside A is a spirosolane-type glycoside with the molecular formula C_{58}H_{95}NO_{29}. The structure of this product is 3-Ο-β-lycotetraosyl (22S,23S,25S)-23-acetoxy-3β,27-dihydroxy-5α-spirosolane 27-Ο-β-D-glucopyranoside. Fujiwara and colleagues were the first to isolate esculeoside A from the ripe fruit of the Cherry tomato in 2002. Esculeoside A, along with many other steroidal alkaloid glycosides, have been shown to possess cytotoxic activity that could result in a variety of potential health benefits for humans.

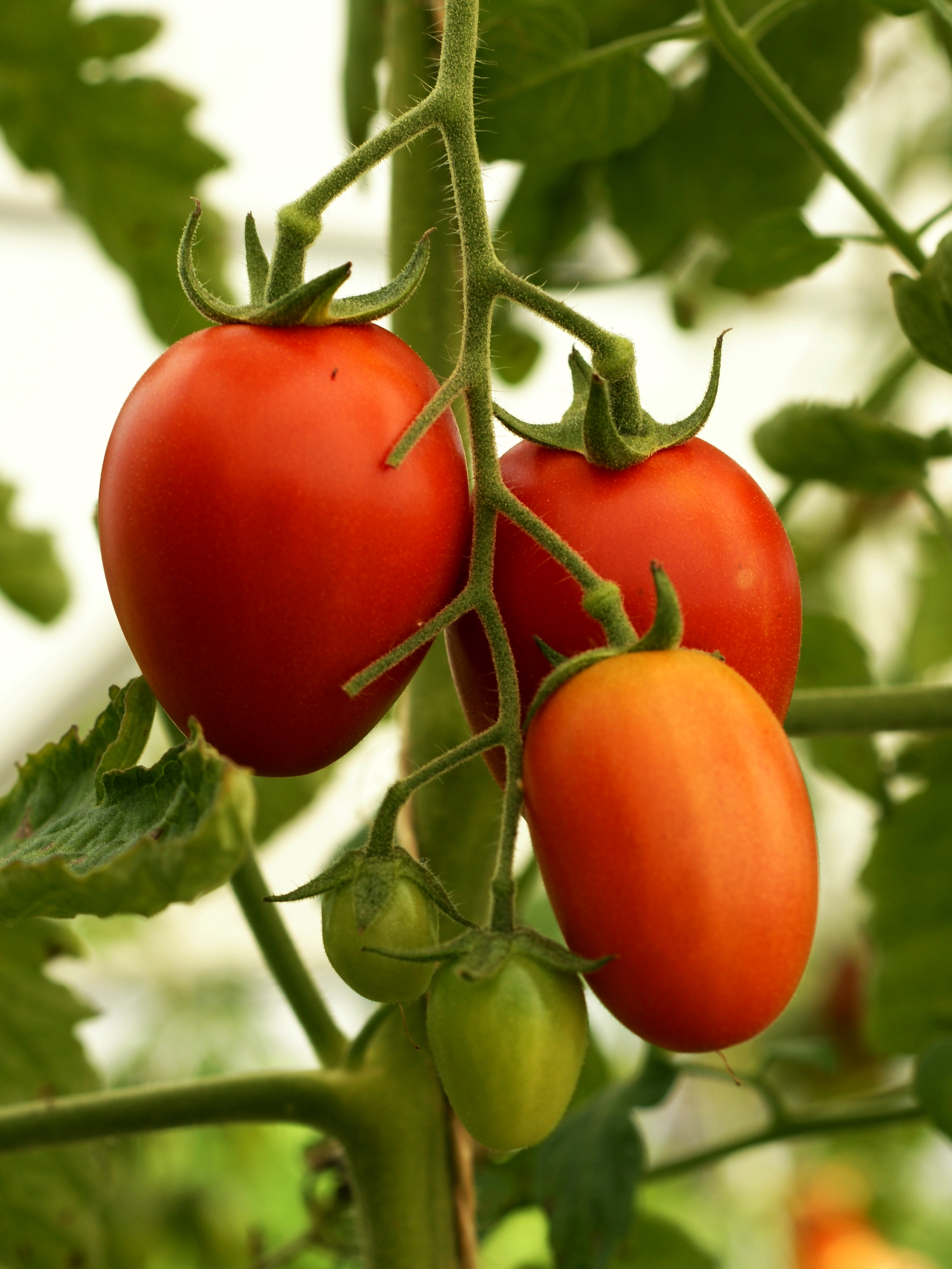
Solanum lycopersicum

== Extraction ==
This natural product can be obtained using column chromatographies of high-porous polystyrene gels and reversed silica gels from a methanolic extract of many varieties of tomatoes. It will appear as colorless needles when synthesized using this method.

== Biosynthesis ==
Evidence suggests that α-tomatine is a precursor of esculeoside A. In order for α-tomatine to be converted to esculeoside A, isomerization of the F-ring is required. The mechanism for this reaction is unclear at this time but research from Iijima and colleagues in 2009 suggest a glycosylation step in the putative pathway from α-tomatine to esculeoside A depends on the plant hormone ethylene.

When humans domesticated tomatoes, they selected for less bitter fruits. This corresponded to the increased activity of a 2-oxoglutarate-dependent dioxygenases called 23DOX (synonym GAME31) during fruit ripening, which converts the bitter and slightly toxic α-tomatine into hydroxytomatine, which is eventually converted into the non-bitter and non-toxic esculeoside A.

== Occurrence ==
Potatoes, eggplant, and tomatoes are all solanaceous plants that contain unique glycoalkaloids. In the case of tomatoes, one of those unique glycoalkaloids is esculeoside A. A tomato saponin, esculeoside A, is found in quantities four times that of lycopene in ripe tomatoes.

== Potential health benefits ==
Studies have shown esculeoside A may be metabolized into derivatives that perform various beneficial activities in the human body including anti-osteoporosis, anti-menopausal disorder and anti-tumor activities. Recent studies in mice have shown a potential link between esculeoside A and cholesterol levels. In one study, esculeoside A administered to mice reduced serum levels of LDL cholesterol and triglycerides by 25-45% without impacting the rates of HDL cholesterol. The potential health benefits of esculeoside A appear to change with factors such as the age of the tomato fruit, the heat used in processing tomatoes, and the pH used in processing. The highest amounts of esculeoside A were found in the outer skin and wall (pericarp wall) of the tomato fruit. Mature tomatoes tended to show higher amounts of esculeoside A than extracts taken from immature tomatoes. Extracts of esculeoside A in the Katsumata study were shown to be stable when heated until the point of 225 °C. This same study found esculeoside A extracts in water at pH 7-11 were stable throughout the heat sterilization process but unstable under acidic conditions. Research has also shown esculeoside A amounts increase when tomatoes are treated with the phytohormone, ethylene. Collectively, research suggests daily intake of esculeoside A from tomatoes could have many benefits.
