= Lanatoside C =

Chemical compound

Clinical data
- Other names: [6-[6-[6-[[12,14-dihydroxy- 10,13-dimethyl- 17-(5-oxo-2H-furan-3-yl)- 1,2,3,4,5,6,7,8,9,11,12,15,16,17- tetradecahydrocyclopenta[a]phenanthren- 3-yl]oxy]- 4-hydroxy- 2-methyloxan- 3-yl]oxy- 4-hydroxy- 2-methyloxan-3-yl]oxy- 2-methyl- 3-[3,4,5-trihydroxy- 6-(hydroxymethyl)oxan-2-yl]oxyoxan- 4-yl] acetate
- AHFS/Drugs.com: International Drug Names
- Routes of administration: Oral, intravenous
- ATC code: C01AA06 (WHO)

Identifiers
- IUPAC name: (3β,5β,12β)- 3-{[β-D- glucopyranosyl- (1→4)- 3-O-acetyl- 2,6-dideoxy- β-D-ribo- hexopyranosyl- (1→4)- 2,6-dideoxy- β-D- ribo- hexopyranosyl- (1→4)- 2,6-dideoxy- β-D- ribo- hexopyranosyl]oxy}- 12,14-dihydroxycard- 20(22)- enolide
- CAS Number: 17575-22-3
- PubChem CID: 656630
- ChemSpider: 570984
- UNII: 5RR3JFZ771
- KEGG: D01972
- ChEMBL: ChEMBL506569
- CompTox Dashboard (EPA): DTXSID7023198
- ECHA InfoCard: 100.037.754

Chemical and physical data
- Formula: C_{49}H_{76}O_{20}
- Molar mass: 985.127 g·mol^{−1}
- 3D model (JSmol): Interactive image
- SMILES: C[C@@H]1[C@H]([C@H](C[C@@H](O1)O[C@H]2CC[C@]3([C@@H](C2)CC[C@@H]4[C@@H]3C[C@H]([C@]5([C@@]4(CC[C@@H]5C6=CC(=O)OC6)O)C)O)C)O)O[C@H]7C[C@@H]([C@@H]([C@H](O7)C)O[C@H]8C[C@@H]([C@@H]([C@H](O8)C)O[C@H]9[C@@H]([C@H]([C@@H]([C@H](O9)CO)O)O)O)OC(=O)C)O
- InChI: InChI=1S/C49H76O20/c1-21-43(67-38-17-32(53)44(22(2)62-38)68-39-18-33(64-24(4)51)45(23(3)63-39)69-46-42(58)41(57)40(56)34(19-50)66-46)31(52)16-37(61-21)65-27-9-11-47(5)26(14-27)7-8-29-30(47)15-35(54)48(6)28(10-12-49(29,48)59)25-13-36(55)60-20-25/h13,21-23,26-35,37-46,50,52-54,56-59H,7-12,14-20H2,1-6H3/t21-,22-,23-,26-,27+,28-,29-,30+,31+,32+,33+,34-,35-,37+,38+,39+,40-,41+,42-,43-,44-,45-,46+,47+,48+,49+/m1/s1; Key:JAYAGJDXJIDEKI-PTGWOZRBSA-N

Lanatoside C (or isolanid) is a cardiac glycoside, a type of drug that can be used in the treatment of congestive heart failure and cardiac arrhythmia (irregular heartbeat). Lanatoside C can be used orally or by the intravenous route. It is marketed in a number of countries and is also available in generic form. Its main indications are rapid response atrial fibrilation and paroxysmal supraventricular tachycardia, two common types of arrhythmia.

It is found in Digitalis lanata.

== Chemistry ==
The substance is composed of four monosaccharides (glucose, 3-acetyldigitoxose and two digitoxoses) and an aglycon named digoxigenin.
