= MRNA-based disease diagnosis =

Disease diagnosis using messenger RNA

Workflow of blood-based mRNA test on specific cancers.

mRNA-based disease diagnosis technologies are diagnostic procedures using messenger RNAs. as molecular diagnostic tools to discover the relationships between patient's DNAs and their specific biological features. The mRNA-based disease diagnosis technologies have been applied to medical field widely in recent years, especially on early diagnosis of tumors (such as renal cell carcinoma, hepatocellular carcinoma, breast cancer and prostate cancer). The technology can be applied to various types of samples depending on how easily the samples are accessible and whether the samples reliably contain the mRNA that related to specific diseases. For example, in hepatocellular carcinoma, the tumor tissues excised during the operation are a good resource for mRNA-based test to analysis. Among those most commonly used samples, blood sample is one of the most easily accessible via minimally invasive method. degenerative diseases . Blood has been used in early diagnosis of some cancers, such as non-small lung cancer and neuroendocrine tumors.

== Background ==
Even though modern medicine has been developing for centuries, we are still faced with quite number of medical challenges. For example, in breast cancer, three traditional expressions are routinely screened for target therapy. However, for the triple negative breast cancer, none of those biomarkers can be detected leaving it with poor prognosis and high mortality. Innovative technologies like mRNA are aimed to addressing such health-related issues that still exist today.

=== Commonly used methods in mRNA-based disease diagnosis ===
RNA sequencing (RNA-seq)
RNA-seq is a high-throughput RNA sequencing technology that allows scientists to profile the entire RNA (transcriptome). Therefore, novel transcripts and gene expression level can be identified based on cDNA libraries. This method can be used for cancer diagnosis and treatment evaluation.

Reverse transcription polymerase chain reaction (RT-PCR)
RT-PCR is a widely used mRNA expression detection method. It enables reverse transcription of mRNA to cDNA for further identification and qualification. In early 1992, RT-PCR was applied in PSA gene expression in peripheral blood for early prostate cancer diagnosis.

Digital PCR (dPCR)
dPCR is a relatively accurate quantification method of measuring the initial concentration of mRNA targets. It can be applied to analyze genetic and epigenetic changes.

In-situ hybridization (ISH)
ISH is a tissue dependent visualization method of identifying mRNA targeted in the samples. The "tissue" can be blood sample. In chronic myeloid leukemia, ISH has been applied on peripheral-blood specimens.

== Workflow ==
A general workflow of mRNA-based disease diagnosis can be summarized as the following steps:

1. Sample collection for targeted disease: Samples for mRNA-based technology can be blood, urine, cell culture, tissue biopsy, bronchial alveola lavage, saliva, cerebrospinal fluid. The basic principle to acquire the biological samples for mRNA-based disease diagnosis is that the samples are suitable, accessible, preservable, ethical and minimum invasive. Moreover for some specific research, the samples should be collected within certain time to guarantee the quality and reduce potential contaminants.
2. RNA processing: This step includes RNA extraction, reverse transcription to cDNA, amplification and detection. The aim to process RNA is to qualify and quantify the suspected genes for further analysis.
3. Data analysis: After obtaining the qualified raw data from last step, bioinformatics technology will be applied to further analysis the data. There are different tools and software for data analysis, including data normalization, statistical analysis, and modeling. The aim is to select specific genes that are significantly different expressed between disease and non-disease samples. Those selected genes can be identified as diagnostic biomarkers for further validation.
4. mRNA biomarker validation: The mRNA biomarkers are selected by bioinformatic methods. Thus, they need to be tested with real samples with reliable experiment on real identified samples with clear and accurate clinical diagnosis.
5. Clinical application: The validated mRNA-based diagnostic method for specific diseases can be conducted along with other clinical examinations to achieve a comprehensive evaluation of the patient's status. mRNA-based examination can provide the medical workers with interpretation at RNA levels and assist on further therapy advice.

== Characteristics ==
=== High sensitivity ===
Take breast cancer as an example. The sensitivity of traditional ultrasound screening for breast cancer can be 76%. While with the blood-based mRNA diagnostic method, the sensitivity could be 80.6%.

=== Qualified and quantitive measurement ===
mRNA-based disease diagnostic technologies allow quantitive measurement of mRNA in the certain samples, such as leukemia

=== Guiding personalized therapy ===
As some technologies such as RNA-seq can provide the entire transcriptome of individual, the mRNA-based disease diagnosis can be developed in the landscape of personalized medicine. In HER-2 breast cancer, detection of ERBB2 mRNA expression levels is helpful in predicting response to anti-HER2-based treatments.

=== Early diagnostic and predictive method ===
As mentioned above, the mRNA-based disease diagnostic technology is more sensitive and specific to certain diseases. Even though there is no obvious symptom, the mRNA-based disease diagnostic technology can serve as screening method for early changes in RNA levels. High serum metadherin mRNA expression was observed in colorectal cancer and associated with poorly differentiated histological grades
