= Digoxin =

Plant-derived medication

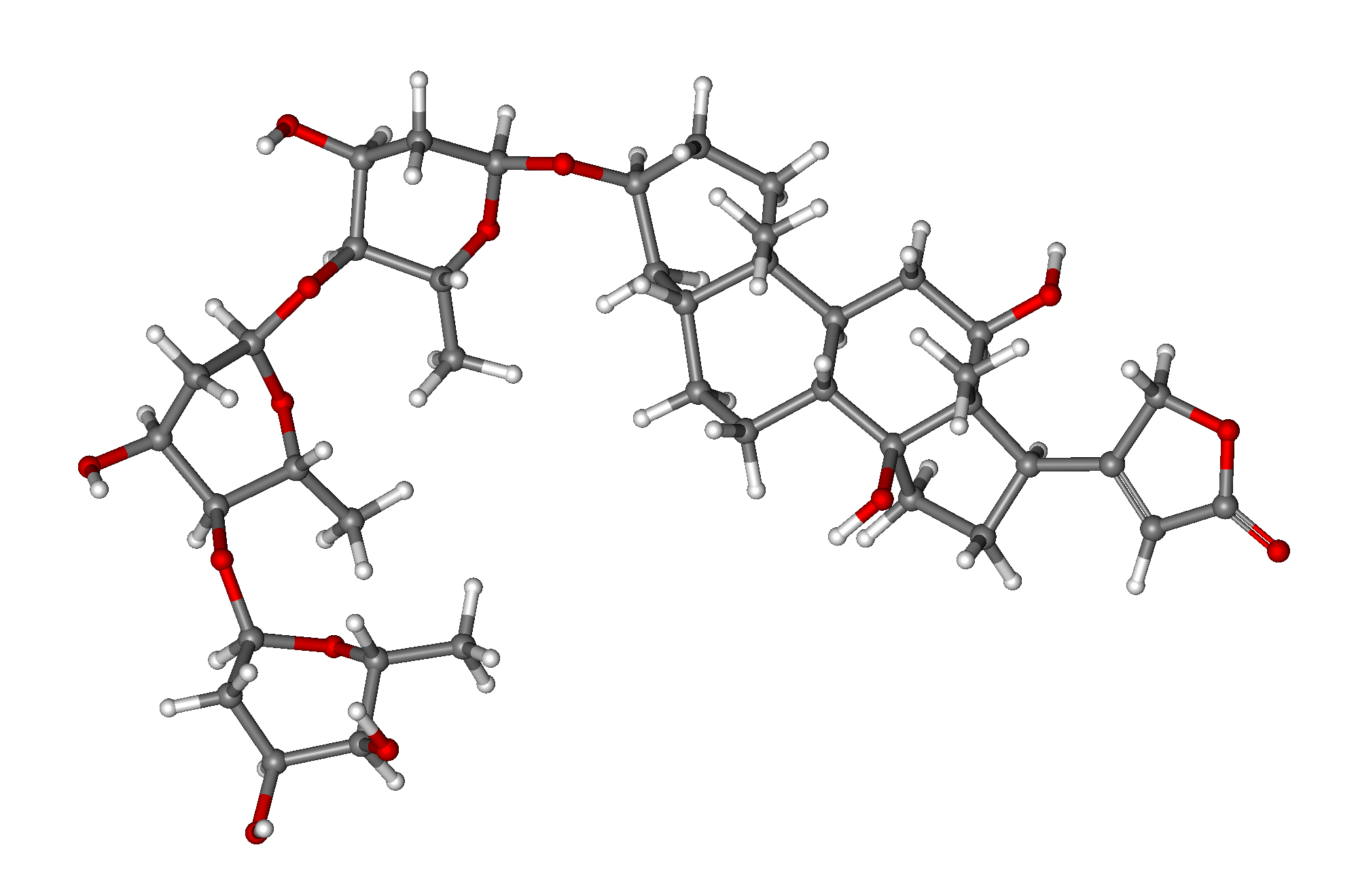

Clinical data
- Pronunciation: /dɪˈdʒɒksɪn/
- Trade names: Lanoxin, others
- AHFS/Drugs.com: Monograph
- MedlinePlus: a682301
- License data: US DailyMed: Digoxin
- Pregnancy category: AU: A
- Routes of administration: By mouth, intravenous
- ATC code: C01AA05 (WHO)

Legal status
- Legal status: AU: S4 (Prescription only); UK: POM (Prescription only); US: ℞-only

Pharmacokinetic data
- Bioavailability: 60 to 80% (by mouth)
- Protein binding: 25%
- Metabolism: Liver (16%)
- Elimination half-life: 36 to 48 hours (normal kidney function); 3.5 to 5 days (impaired kidney function)
- Excretion: Kidney

Identifiers
- IUPAC name: 3β-[(O-2,6-dideoxy-β-D-ribo-hexopyranosyl-(1→4)-O-2,6-dideoxy-β-D-ribo-hexopyranosyl-(1→4)-2,6-dideoxy-β-D-ribo-hexopyranosyl)oxy]-12β,14-dihydroxy-5β-card-20(22)-enolide
- CAS Number: 20830-75-5
- PubChem CID: 2724385
- IUPHAR/BPS: 4726
- DrugBank: DB00390
- ChemSpider: 2006532
- UNII: 73K4184T59
- KEGG: D00298
- ChEBI: CHEBI:4551
- ChEMBL: ChEMBL1751
- PDB ligand: DGX (PDBe, RCSB PDB)
- CompTox Dashboard (EPA): DTXSID5022934
- ECHA InfoCard: 100.040.047

Chemical and physical data
- Formula: C_{41}H_{64}O_{14}
- Molar mass: 780.949 g·mol^{−1}
- 3D model (JSmol): Interactive image
- Melting point: 249.3 °C (480.7 °F)
- Solubility in water: 0.0648 mg/mL (20 °C)
- SMILES: O=C\1OC/C(=C/1)[C@H]2CC[C@@]8(O)[C@]2(C)[C@H](O)C[C@H]7[C@H]8CC[C@H]6[C@]7(C)CC[C@H](O[C@@H]5O[C@H](C)[C@@H](O[C@@H]4O[C@@H]([C@@H](O[C@@H]3O[C@@H]([C@@H](O)[C@@H](O)C3)C)[C@@H](O)C4)C)[C@@H](O)C5)C6
- InChI: InChI=1S/C41H64O14/c1-19-36(47)28(42)15-34(50-19)54-38-21(3)52-35(17-30(38)44)55-37-20(2)51-33(16-29(37)43)53-24-8-10-39(4)23(13-24)6-7-26-27(39)14-31(45)40(5)25(9-11-41(26,40)48)22-12-32(46)49-18-22/h12,19-21,23-31,33-38,42-45,47-48H,6-11,13-18H2,1-5H3/t19-,20-,21-,23-,24+,25-,26-,27+,28+,29+,30+,31-,33+,34+,35+,36-,37-,38-,39+,40+,41+/m1/s1; Key:LTMHDMANZUZIPE-PUGKRICDSA-N

Digoxin, sold under the brand name Lanoxin, among others, is a medication used to treat various heart conditions. Most frequently it is used for atrial fibrillation, atrial flutter, and heart failure. Digoxin is one of the oldest medications used in the field of cardiology. It works by increasing myocardial contractility, increasing stroke volume and blood pressure, reducing heart rate, and somewhat extending the time frame of the contraction. Digoxin is taken by mouth or by injection into a vein. Digoxin has a half life of approximately 36 hours given at average doses in patients with normal renal function. It is excreted mostly unchanged in the urine.

Common side effects include breast enlargement with other side effects generally due to an excessive dose. These side effects may include loss of appetite, nausea, trouble seeing, confusion, and an irregular heartbeat. Greater care is required in older people and those with poor kidney function. It is unclear whether use during pregnancy is safe.

Digoxin is in the cardiac glycoside family of medications. It was first isolated in 1930 from Grecian foxglove (Digitalis lanata). It is on the World Health Organization's List of Essential Medicines. In 2021, it was the 241st most commonly prescribed medication in the United States, with more than 1 million prescriptions.

== Medical uses ==
=== Irregular heartbeat ===
The most common indications for digoxin are atrial fibrillation and atrial flutter with rapid ventricular response, especially in older or less active patients, though beta blockers and/or calcium channel blockers may be preferred in some patients, such as younger more active ones, or those without heart failure or hemodynamic instability.

Early observational studies showed an increased risk of death in patients taking digoxin, despite an attempt to allow for other risk factors for death (so-called propensity score matching). However, systematic reviews focusing on randomised controlled trials of digoxin (which ensured similarity between patients on digoxin, and those not on it) showed no difference in mortality. Evidence suggested the increased mortality in patients taking digoxin was due to their having worse heart disease than those not taking it. Cardiac arrhythmias may also occur when patients are prescribed digoxin alongside thiazides and loop diuretics.

=== Heart failure ===
Digitalis (i.e. extracts, including digoxin, from the plant genus Digitalis) was the first drug used to treat dropsy (swollen ankles—a symptom of heart failure) following its discovery by William Withering. Alongside diuretics, it was the mainstay of treatment for heart failure for over a century. Since the introduction of other drugs with better outcomes and fewer adverse effects, it is generally now only used where heart failure is associated with atrial fibrillation and or a rapid ventricular rate. In certain circumstances it may be used under specialist guidance in addition to, or instead of, the recommended first-line treatments of ACE inhibitor, beta blocker, mineralocorticoid antagonist, and SGLT-2 inhibitor, where they are not effective or not tolerated.

=== Abortion ===
Digoxin is also used intrafetally or amniotically during abortions in the late second trimester and third trimester of pregnancy. It typically causes fetal demise (measured by cessation of cardiac activity) within hours of administration.

=== Euthanasia ===
Digoxin is the primary lethal component of the oral drug combinations DDMA (diazepam, digoxin, morphine, and amitriptyline), DDMP (diazepam, digoxin, morphine, and propranolol), and DDMAPh (diazepam, digoxin, morphine, amitriptyline, and phenobarbital).

Digoxin disrupts the balance of sodium and potassium in the heart which combined with propranolol (which slows heart rate and lowers blood pressure) or amitriptyline (which blocks sodium membrane channels) is able to stop the heart. While diazepam and morphine have no action on the heart, they function to sedate the patient and make them comfortable.

== Side effects ==
The occurrence of adverse drug reactions is common, owing to its narrow therapeutic index (the margin between effectiveness and toxicity). Gynaecomastia (enlargement of breast tissue) is mentioned in many textbooks as a side effect, thought to be due to the estrogen-like steroid moiety of the digoxin molecule, but when systematically sought, the evidence for this is equivocal as of 2005. The combination of increased (atrial) arrhythmogenesis and inhibited atrioventricular (AV) conduction (for example paroxysmal atrial tachycardia with AV block – so-called "PAT with block") is said to be pathognomonic (that is, diagnostic) of digoxin toxicity.

Digoxin can lead to cardiac arrhythmias when given with thiazides and loop diuretics. This is because co-administration of digoxin with drugs such as thiazides and loop diuretics which can cause hypokalemia, low serum levels of potassium in the blood. This exacerbates the potential for cardiac arrhythmias because the low levels of potassium reduces the amount of K+ at the ATPase pump and increase calcium levels too much which leads to these arrhythmias. It can also cause visual disturbances as well as dizziness or fainting.

Several other drugs associated with adverse drug reactions in concomitant use include verapamil, amiodarone, quinidine, tetracycline, and erythromycin.

== Overdose ==
In overdose, the usual supportive measures are needed. If arrhythmias prove troublesome, or malignant hyperkalemia occurs (inexorably rising potassium level due to paralysis of the cell membrane-bound, ATPase-dependent Na/K pumps), the specific antidote is antidigoxin (antibody fragments against digoxin, trade names Digibind and Digifab). The mechanism of action for drugs such as Digibind and Digifab, used when adverse events occur with the use of digoxin, is that the FAB regions on the antibodies created against digoxin expedite the excretion of the drug into urine. Therefore, the amount of digoxin in the body decreases quickly as it gets excreted rapidly.

== Pharmacology ==
=== Pharmacodynamics ===
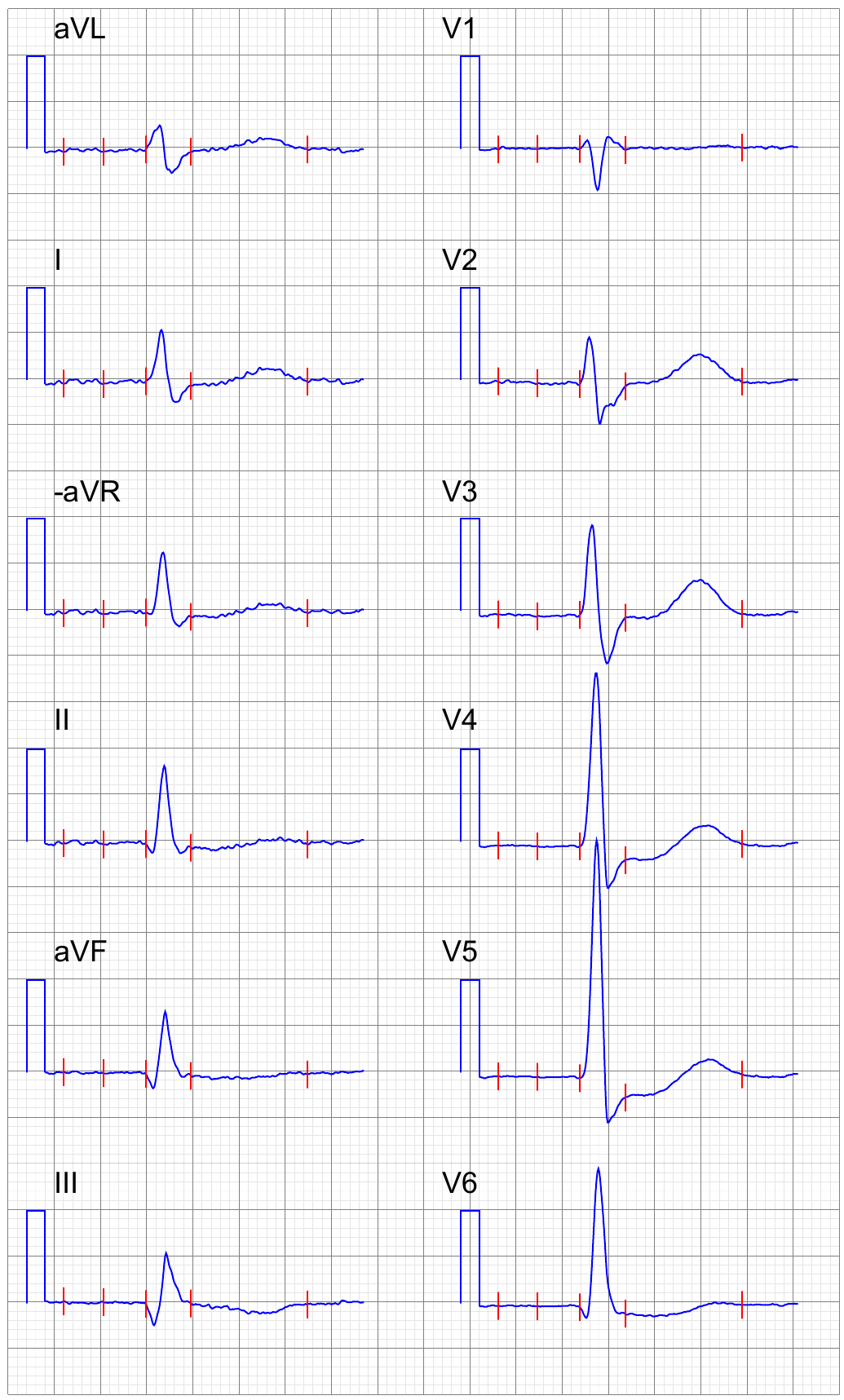
Signal-averaged ECG from a person taking digoxin, explaining ST depressions in mainly precordial leads V4 and V5

Digoxin's primary mechanism of action involves inhibition of the sodium potassium adenosine triphosphatase (Na^{+}/K^{+} ATPase), mainly in the myocardium. This inhibition causes an increase in intracellular sodium levels, resulting in decreased activity of the sodium-calcium exchanger, which normally imports three extracellular sodium ions into the cell and transports one intracellular calcium ion out of the cell. The reversal of this exchanger, triggered by the increase in intracellular sodium, results in an increase in the intracellular calcium concentration that is available to the contractile proteins. The increased calcium concentrations lead to the binding of more calcium to troponin C, which results in increased inotropy. Increased intracellular calcium lengthens phase 4 and phase 0 of the cardiac action potential, which leads to a decrease in heart rate. Increased amounts of Ca^{2+} also leads to increased storage of calcium in the sarcoplasmic reticulum, causing a corresponding increase in the release of calcium during each action potential.

The inhibition of the sodium pump may also improve baroreceptor sensitivity in heart failure and may explain some of the neurohormonal effects of digoxin.

Digoxin also has important parasympathetic effects, particularly on the atrioventricular node. While it does increase the magnitude of myocardial contractility, the duration of the contraction is only slightly increased. Its use as an antiarrhythmic drug, then, comes from its direct and indirect parasympathetic stimulating properties. Vagus nerve stimulation slows down conduction at the AV node by increasing the refractory period of cardiac myocytes. The slowed AV node gives the ventricles more time to fill before contracting. This negative chronotropic effect is synergistic with the direct effect on cardiac pacemaker cells. The arrhythmia itself is not affected, but the pumping function of the heart improves, owing to improved filling.

Overall, the heart rate is decreased while stroke volume is increased, resulting in a net increase in blood pressure, leading to increased tissue perfusion. This causes the myocardium to work more efficiently, with optimized hemodynamics and an improved ventricular function curve.

Other electrical effects include a brief initial increase in action potential, followed by a decrease as the K^{+} conductance increases due to increased intracellular amounts of Ca^{2+} ions. The refractory period of the atria and ventricles is decreased, while it increases in the sinoatrial and AV nodes. A less negative resting membrane potential is made, leading to increased irritability.

The conduction velocity increases in the atria, but decreases in the AV node. The effect upon Purkinje fibers and ventricles is negligible. Automaticity is also increased in the atria, AV node, Purkinje fibers, and ventricles.

ECG changes seen in people taking digoxin include increased PR interval (due to decreased AV conduction) and a shortened QT interval. Also, the T wave may be inverted and accompanied by ST depression. It may cause AV junctional rhythm and ectopic beats (bigeminy) resulting in ventricular tachycardia and fibrillation.

Digoxin is also an M2 receptor muscarinic agonist.

=== Pharmacokinetics ===
Digoxin is usually given orally, but can also be given by IV injection in urgent situations (the IV injection should be slow, and heart rhythm should be monitored). While IV therapy may be better tolerated (less nausea), digoxin has a very long distribution half-life into the cardiac tissue, which will delay its onset of action by a number of hours. The half-life is about 36 hours for patients with normal renal function, digoxin is given once daily, usually in 125 μg or 250 μg doses.

Digoxin elimination is mainly by renal excretion and involves P-glycoprotein, which leads to significant clinical interactions with P-glycoprotein inhibitor drugs. Examples commonly used in patients with heart problems include spironolactone, verapamil and amiodarone. In patients with decreased kidney function the half-life is considerably longer, along with decrease in Vd (volume of distribution), calling for a reduction in dose or a switch to a different glycoside, such as digitoxin (not available in the United States), which has a much longer elimination half-life of around seven days and is eliminated by the liver.

Effective plasma levels vary depending on the medical indication. For congestive heart failure, levels between 0.5 and 1.0 ng/mL are recommended. This recommendation is based on post hoc analysis of prospective trials, suggesting higher levels may be associated with increased mortality rates. For heart rate control (atrial fibrillation), plasma levels are less defined and are generally titrated to a goal heart rate. Typically, digoxin levels are considered therapeutic for heart rate control between 0.5 and 2.0 ng/mL (or 0.6 and 2.6 nmol/L). In suspected toxicity or ineffectiveness, digoxin levels should be monitored. Plasma potassium levels also need to be closely controlled (see side effects, below).

Quinidine, verapamil, and amiodarone increase plasma levels of digoxin (by displacing tissue binding sites and depressing renal digoxin clearance), so plasma digoxin must be monitored carefully when coadministered.

A study which looked to see if digoxin affected men and women differently found that digoxin did not reduce deaths overall, but did result in less hospitalization. Women who took digoxin died "more frequently" (33%) than women who took placebo (29%). Digoxin increased the risk of death in women by 23%. There was no difference in the death rate for men in the study.

Digoxin is also used as a standard control substance to test for P-glycoprotein inhibition.

Digoxin appears to be a peripherally selective drug due to limited brain uptake caused by binding to P-glycoprotein.

=== Pharmacomicrobiomics ===
The bacteria Eggerthella lenta has been linked to a decrease in the toxicity of digoxin. These effects have been studied through comparisons of North Americans and Southern Indians, in which a reduced digoxin metabolite profile correlates with E. lenta abundance. Further studies have also revealed an increase in digoxin toxicity when used alongside erythromycin or tetracycline, the researchers attributed this to the decrease in the E. lenta population.

== History ==
Derivatives of plants of the genus Digitalis have a long history of medical use. Nicholas Culpeper referred to various medical uses for foxglove in his 1652 publication The English physician. William Withering is credited with the first published description of the systematic use of Digitalis derivatives in his 1785 book An Account of the Foxglove and some of its Medical Uses With Practical Remarks on Dropsy and Other Diseases. Its use was somewhat sporadic until Sir James Mackenzie identified the phenomenon of atrial fibrillation, and the actions of digitalis on this. Its effects were first explained by Arthur Robertson Cushny. The name is a portmanteau, derived from Digitalis lanata and toxin.

In 1930, digoxin was first isolated by Dr. Sydney Smith from the foxglove plant, Digitalis lanata. Initially, the digoxin was purified by dissolving the dried plant material in acetone and boiling the solution in chloroform. The solution was then reacted with acetic acid and small amount of ferric chloride and sulfuric acid (Keller reaction). Digoxin was distinguishable from other glucosides by the olive-green colored solution produced from this reaction, completely free of red.

== Society and culture ==
Charles Cullen admitted in 2003 to killing as many as 40 hospital patients with overdoses of heart medication—usually digoxin—at hospitals in New Jersey and Pennsylvania over his 19-year career as a nurse. On March 10, 2006, he was sentenced to 18 consecutive life sentences and is not eligible for parole.

On April 25, 2008, the U.S. Food and Drug Administration (FDA) issued a press release alerting the public to a Class I recall of Digitek, a brand of digoxin produced by Mylan. Some tablets had been released at double thickness and therefore double strength, causing some patients to experience digoxin toxicity. A class-action lawsuit against the Icelandic generic drug maker Actavis was announced two weeks later.

On March 31, 2009, the FDA announced another generic digoxin pill recall by posting this company press release on the agency's web site: "Caraco Pharmaceutical Laboratories, Ltd. Announces a Nationwide Voluntary Recall of All Lots of Digoxin Tablets Due to Size Variability". A March 31 press release from Caraco, a generic pharmaceutical company, stated:

[All] tablets of Caraco brand Digoxin, USP, 0.125 mg, and Digoxin, USP, 0.25 mg, distributed prior to March 31, 2009, which are not expired and are within the expiration date of September, 2011, are being voluntarily recalled to the consumer level. The tablets are being recalled because they may differ in size and therefore could have more or less of the active ingredient, digoxin.

A 2008 study suggested digoxin has beneficial effects not only for the heart, but also in reducing the risk of certain kinds of cancer. However, comments on this study suggested that digoxin is not effective at reducing cancer risk at therapeutic concentrations of the drug, so the results need further investigation.

=== Brand names ===
Digoxin preparations are marketed under the brand names Cardigox; Cardiogoxin; Cardioxin; Cardoxin; Coragoxine; Digacin; Digicor; Digitek; Digomal; Digon; Digosin; Digoxine Navtivelle; Digoxina-Sandoz; Digoxin-Sandoz; Digoxin-Zori; Dilanacin; Eudigox; Fargoxin; Grexin; Lanacordin; Lanacrist; Lanicor; Lanikor; Lanorale; Lanoxicaps; Lanoxin; Lanoxin PG; Lenoxicaps; Lenoxin; Lifusin; Mapluxin; Natigoxin; Novodigal; Purgoxin; Sigmaxin; Sigmaxin-PG; Toloxin.

In Serbia, Dilacor is a brand name for it.

== Digoxin and cancer ==
Cardiac glycosides, particularly digoxin, have been conventionally used for treatment of common cardiac problems, mainly heart failure and cardiac arrhythmias. The interaction of digoxin and cancer has also been studied. Despite existence of numerous preclinical studies that investigated the anticancer effects of digoxin, there are no solid and conclusive results so far.

Several studies have suggested that digoxin may have anticancer properties, others not.

Digoxin, as a cardiac glycoside, has a chemical structure basically similar to that of estradiol. Digoxin has the ability to bind oestrogen receptors, and therefore it has been proposed that it might increase the risk of oestrogen-sensitive breast and uterine cancers. A large Danish study found a complicated picture, with slightly increased risk of breast cancer amongst women taking digoxin, but better prognostic features. The Nurses' Health Study found a similar slight increase of risk.

Digoxin inhibits the proliferation of many cancerous cell lines in vitro, but its relevance to cancer in vivo remains unclear.

== See also ==
- Lanatoside C (isolanid, Cedilanid – four glycoside analog), Digoxigenin (aglycone analog)
