= Digitalis orientalis =

Digitalis orientalis can refer to:

- Digitalis orientalis Elmig., a synonym of Digitalis lanata Ehrh. subsp. lanata
- Digitalis orientalis Lam., a synonym of Digitalis lamarckii Ivanina
- Digitalis orientalis Mill., a synonym of Digitalis grandiflora Mill.
