= Riboprobe =

A Riboprobe, abbreviation of RNA probe, is a segment of labelled RNA that can be used to detect a target mRNA or DNA during in situ hybridization. RNA probes can be produced by in vitro transcription of cloned DNA inserted in a suitable plasmid downstream of a viral promoter. Some bacterial viruses code for their own RNA polymerases, which are highly specific for the viral promoters. Using these enzymes, labeled NTPs, and inserts inserted in both forward and reverse orientations, both sense and antisense riboprobes can be generated from a cloned gene.

Since James Watson and Francis Crick revealed the double helix nature of DNA molecule (Watson & Crick, 1953), the hydrogen bonds between the four bases are well known: adenine always binds to thymine and cytosine always binds to guanine. This binding pattern is the basic principle of modern genetic technologies. Joseph Gall and Mary Lou Pardue published a paper in 1969 demonstrating that radioactive marked ribosomal DNA can be used to detect its complementary DNA sequence in a frog egg, known as the first researchers who use DNA probes to perform in situ hybridization. RNA probes were proved to be able to perform the same function and also used with in situ hybridization. Fluorescent dyed probes replaced radio labeled probes due to the consideration of safety, stability, and ease of detection. Detecting a DNA sequence is similar to "looking for a needle in a haystack, with the needle being the DNA sequence of interest and the haystack being a set of chromosomes". The ability of the DNA helix to disassociate, re-anneal and the remarkable accuracy of base-pairing grants riboprobes the ability to locate its complementary DNA sequence on chromosomes.

It is found by two independent riboprobes, that the most important cell populations of the hippocampus, are expressing high levels of diacylglycerol lipase α (DGL-α), an enzyme involved in the production of the endocannabinoid 2-arachidonoyl-glycerol (2-AG: C_{23}H_{38}O_{4}; 20:4, ω-6).

== Applications ==
There are two kinds of probes used during in situ hybridization: Riboprobes and DNA oligonucleotides probes. Riboprobes are essential in the study of embryo development in which DNA probes are insufficient. With labelled (fluoresce-dyed, for instance) antisense RNA probes hybridized with developing embryo's mRNA, tracking the expression of genes in different stages of development is possible. RNA probes can be used in detecting either whole embryo's development or just on tissue sections of interest. The ability of riboprobes to bind to transcribed mRNA makes RNA probes important in research on model organisms: Drosophila, zebrafish, chick, Xenopus and mouse. RNA probes can also be utilized in immunohistochemistry to identify tissue infection in embryos. Viral mRNA can be targeted by its antisense RNA probes, while infected tissues don't have complementary mRNA that can hybridize with probes; the unique mRNA sequence of each organism makes the detection of expression of certain gene highly effective and accurate.

Fluorescence in situ hybridization (FISH)is the most widely used riboprobe technique. A target sequence and a probe are essential in FISH. First, the probe is labeled with either direct or indirect labeling strategy: hapten-modified nucleotides are used in indirect labeling, and fluorophore-modified nucleotides are used in direct labeling. The target DNA and probes are denatured and mixed, allows the re-annealing of DNA sequences. Indirect labeling requires an extra step to produce visualized signals that require use of enzymatic or immunological system, but provides greater signal amplification than direct labeling.

FISH probes can also be used in karyotype studies. DNA probes can be labeled with various fluorochromes which produce a unique color for each chromosomes. The probes are then hybridized with metaphase chromosomes, producing unique patterns on each chromosomes. This method is useful when people want to study the translocation, deletion and duplication of chromosomes on a larger scale comparing to site-specific FISH.
