= Glycoalkaloid =

Class of chemical compounds

Chemical structure of α-solanine distinguishing the sugar (solatriose moiety) and the alkaloid (solanidine moiety) portions

Glycoalkaloids are a family of chemical compounds derived from alkaloids to which sugar groups are appended. Most have a bitter taste and confer some protection against plant pathogens and herbivores. Several are potentially toxic to humans, most notably the poisons commonly found in the plant species Solanum dulcamara (bittersweet nightshade) and other plants in the genus Solanum, including potato. Some are antinutritional factors. They are an example of chemical defense in plants.

A prototypical glycoalkaloid is solanine (composed of the sugar solanose and the alkaloid solanidine), which is found in the potato. The alkaloidal portion of the glycoalkaloid is also generically referred to as an aglycone. The intact glycoalkaloid is poorly absorbed from the gastrointestinal tract, therefore causing gastrointestinal irritation. The aglycone is absorbed and is believed to be responsible for observed nervous system signs.

== Types ==
The glycoalkaloids found in Solanum can be divided into two types by the structure of the alkaloid part (i.e. the part without the sugar, the aglycone): the less toxic spirosolane type represented by tomatine from tomatoes and the more toxic solanidane type represented by solanine and chaconine from potatoes. The solanidane backbone is produced from the spirosolane backbone by an enzyme called DPS, which is not found in tomatoes and eggplants.

== Function ==
=== Toxicity ===
One class of solanidane glycoalkaloids called leptinines protect the wild potato species Solanum chacoense against the colorado potato beetle. It is not produced by the cultivated potato due to it not having the required GAME32 gene.

=== Taste ===
Glycoalkaloids are typically bitter tasting, and produce a burning irritation in the back of the mouth and side of the tongue. This deters potential predators from the plant. The Aymara people of Bolivia use taste to detect the levels of glycoalkaloids in potatoes to determine the safety of various cultigens.

== Crop breeding ==
When humans domesticated tomatoes, they selected for less bitter fruits. This corresponded to the increased activity of a 2-oxoglutarate-dependent dioxygenases called 23DOX (synonym GAME31) during fruit ripening, which converts the bitter and slightly toxic α-tomatine into hydroxytomatine, which is eventually converted into the non-bitter and non-toxic esculeoside A.

== Detection ==
Although not routinely available, detection of alkaloids in tissues or urine is possible for laboratory diagnosis of exposure.

== As a medication ==
Sale of a glycoalkaloid-based treatment marketed by Lane Labs USA Inc. for prevention of skin cancer was banned by the FDA in 2004 as an unapproved drug.
