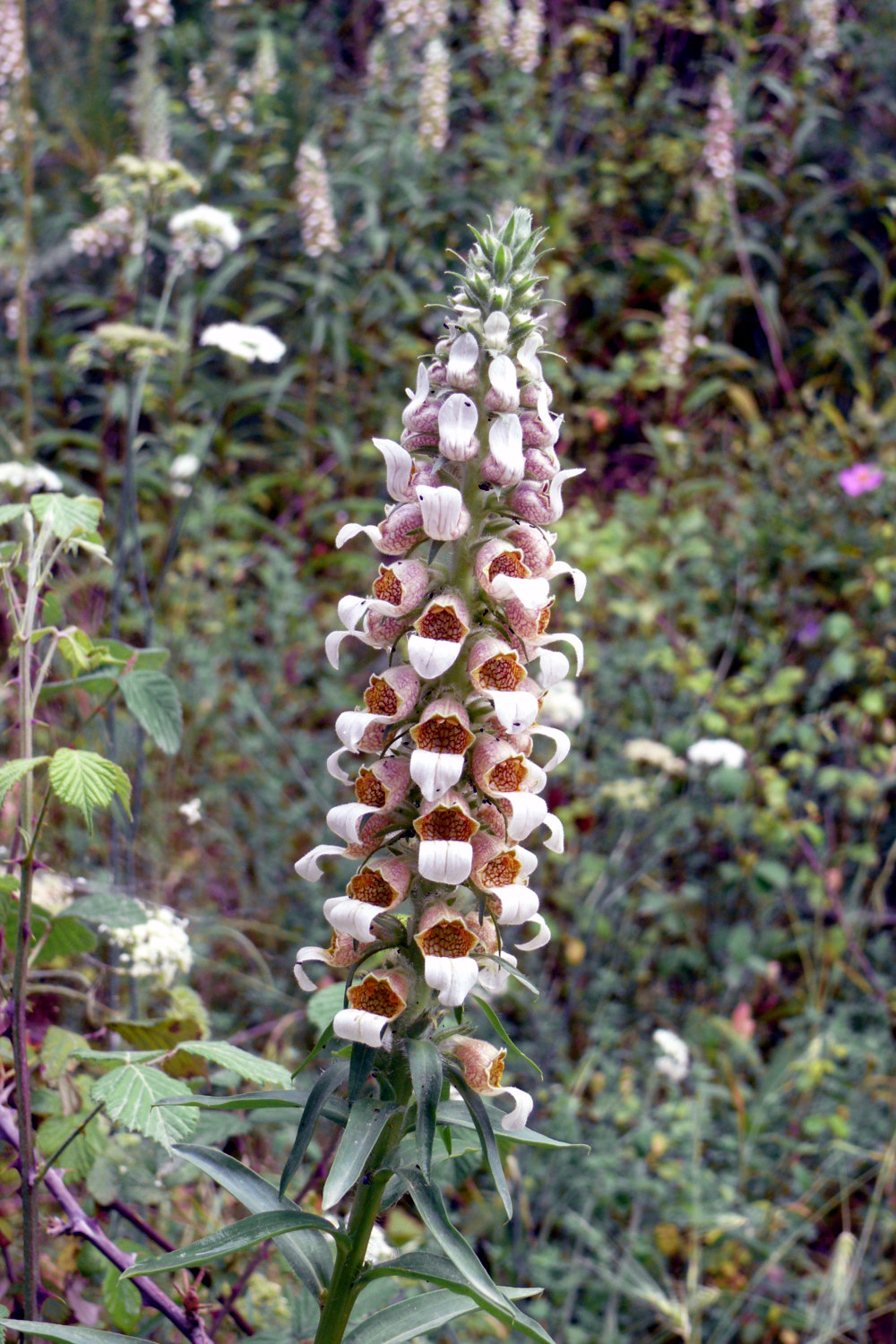
- flowering in situ on the island of Thasos, Greece

Scientific classification
- Kingdom: Plantae
- Clade: Embryophytes
- Clade: Tracheophytes
- Clade: Angiosperms
- Clade: Eudicots
- Clade: Asterids
- Order: Lamiales
- Family: Plantaginaceae
- Genus: Digitalis
- Species: D. lanata

Binomial name
- Digitalis lanata Ehrh., 1792

Synonyms
- Digitalis epiglottidea Brera ex Steud.; Digitalis eriostachya Besser ex Rchb.; Digitalis nova Winterl ex Lindl.; Digitalis orientalis Elmig.; Digitalis winterli Roth

= Digitalis lanata =

Species of flowering plant in the plantain family

Digitalis lanata, vernacularly often called woolly foxglove or Grecian foxglove, is a species of foxglove, a flowering plant in the plantain family Plantaginaceae. It gets its name due to the woolly indumentum of the leaves. D. lanata, like other foxglove species, is toxic in all parts of the plant. Symptoms of digitalis poisoning include nausea, vomiting, severe headache, dilated pupils, problems with eyesight, and convulsions and cardiac arrhythmias at the worst level of toxicity. The plant is also harmful to other animals.

== Description ==
Digitalis lanata is a biennial or perennial growing from a woody, horizontal rootstock. There is a tidy rosette before the spike goes up, and it is neatly arranged around the purple-tinged stems. The plant commonly forms a single, upright, more or less uniformly leafy stem that is partly ascending at the base. The plant send up these stems and flowers usually in its second year. The stems are 0.3 to 0.6 meters in height, or about 13 to 26 inches.

The leaves are moderately green in colour, woolly, veined, and covered with white hairs on the underside. They have a very bitter taste. The lower cauline leaves are 6 to 12 cm (sometimes to 20 cm) long and 1.5 to 3.5 cm wide, the upper cauline leaves are 4 to 10 cm long and lanceolate shaped, usually with entire margins, and with a distinctive mid-rib. The leaves along the stalks are alternate. The lower stem leaves wither by early flowering. Both flowers and stems are also woolly or hairy.

The inflorescence axis is densely covered with densely matted woolly hairs (tomentose), and the flowers are densely arranged into a raceme that is pyramidal in shape. The flowers are tubular and bell shaped, pale yellow to whitish with brown or violet lines (ferruginous reticulated markings), and the centre lobe of the lower lip is 8 to 13 mm long.

The fruit is a conical capsule with a blunt end topped by a short beak. The seeds which develop within are quadrangular or prismatic in shape, and are about 0.6mm broad and 1.1 to 1.3 mm long.

== Distribution ==
It is native to Anatolia and the Balkans, where it is found in Albania, Bulgaria, Croatia, Greece, Thrace (European Turkey), Hungary, Serbia, Kosovo and Romania, eastwards to northern Moldova. It has been introduced to Ukrainian Galicia, Austria, the Czech Republic, Estonia and Germany. Its presence in Slovakia is questionable.

In the US it has naturalised in a number of northeastern states. Although it has yet only spread to a few counties per state, it is still considered potentially invasive or a noxious weed. The state of Minnesota considers it a noxious weed, and it is an invasive species of grasslands and woodlands in Wisconsin, and Kansas. As of 2001, it may not be imported into Kansas. It has also naturalised in the US states of Connecticut, Indiana, Maine, Maryland, Massachusetts, Michigan, Minnesota, Nebraska, New Hampshire, New Jersey, New York, Ohio, Pennsylvania, Vermont and West Virginia. In Canada it has become naturalised in southern Ontario and Quebec. Other areas where it might be naturalised are Vietnam and the western Himalayas.

== Etimology ==
The word lanatus means 'woolly'.

== Ecology ==
In Minnesota, it spends its first year as a basal rosette. The subsequent years, it flowers in June and July, and the seeds ripen in early-mid September. The flowers are perfect (having both male and female organs). Bees pollinate the flowers. In Ukraine and Moldova it flowers in July and August.

The species is adapted to sunny and warm sites. It prefers part shade and humus-rich soil, but also grows in sandy, stony loamy, and clay soils under dry or moist conditions.

During the first vegetation period, only the leaf rosette is developed, flowering follows during the second vegetation period. Therefore, especially during the first year, there is a high resistance against drought stress. The leaves remain somewhat turgid even under very low leaf water potential, due to osmotic adaptation by synthesis of non-ionic substances in the leaves. The drought induced diminishing of photosynthesis is reversible after a few hours following watering of the plants. Drought stress also reduces the quantum yield of photosystem 2. More than 70 bitter glycosides with cardiac activity, with five different aglyconees digitoxigenin, gitoxigenin, digoxigenin, diginatigenin and gitaloxigenin in the leaves act as a protection against herbivores. Yield and concentration of these cardiac glycosides are enhanced by greenhouse cultivation through enhanced temperature and enhanced carbon dioxide concentration.

== Uses ==
=== Medical ===
Digitalis lanata contains a powerful cardiac glycoside that may be used by patients with heart conditions. Digoxin (digitalin) is a drug that is extracted from D. lanata. It is used to treat some heart conditions such as atrial fibrillation and cardiac arrhythmias. Its cardiotonic effects slows atrioventricular conduction so that the heartbeat slows down and slightly increases contraction power (positive inotropic effect). Because of the improved circulation in congestive heart failure caused by fast atrial fibrillation, the kidneys can function better, which stimulates the flow of urine, which lowers the volume of the blood and lessens the load on the heart.

The medical uses of Digitalis glycosides in veterinary care has been controversial because of its relatively low therapeutic to toxicity profile, divergent physiological responses, variation in side effects, and the difficulty in demonstrating positive therapeutic responses.

Cardiac glycosides from D. lanata and other natural sources have toxic effects, producing ventricular automaticity and vagal effects, resulting in AV nodal blocking. Acute toxicity produces nausea, vomiting, lethargy, confusion, and weakness.

William Withering is credited as the first to clinically investigate the plant as a therapy for dropsy, writing a book in 1785 about the potential medical uses of D. purpurea extracts after his human trials.

Digitalin was not discovered until the mid-19th century by two French scientists Homolle Ouevenne and Theodore Ouevenne. It was not until 1875 that Oscar Schmiedberg identified digoxin in the plant. It was first isolated in the 1930s in Britain by Sydney Smith. Today it is still extracted from the plant because industrial synthesis is too expensive and difficult. However, it is becoming less frequently used due to the narrow therapeutic margin and high potential for severe side effects. Digoxin is being replaced by newer drugs including beta blockers, angiotensin-converting enzyme inhibitors, and the calcium channel blocking agents. As new pharmacotherapeutic agents arise, the use of digitalis preparations is expected to continue to decline.

Asylums used digitalis extracts throughout the 19th century as sedatives along with hyoscine and opiates.

The commercial production of digoxin from D. lanata involves growing the plant from seed for two years, harvesting and drying it in a silo, then the leaves are crushed into a powder, and the compound is extracted and purified using chemical processes.

=== Other ===
Digoxigenin (DIG) is a steroid found in the flowers and leaves of Digitalis species, and is extracted from D. lanata. Digoxigenin can be used as a molecular probe to detect mRNA in situ and label DNA, RNA, and oligonucleotides. It can easily be attached to nucleotides such as uridine by chemical modifications. DIG molecules are often linked to nucleotides; DIG-labelled uridine can then be incorporated into RNA via in vitro transcription. Once hybridisation occurs, RNA with the incorporated DIG-U can be detected with anti-DIG antibodies conjugated to alkaline phosphatase. To reveal the hybridised transcripts, a chromogen can be used which reacts with the alkaline phosphatase to produce a coloured precipitate.

== Pictures ==
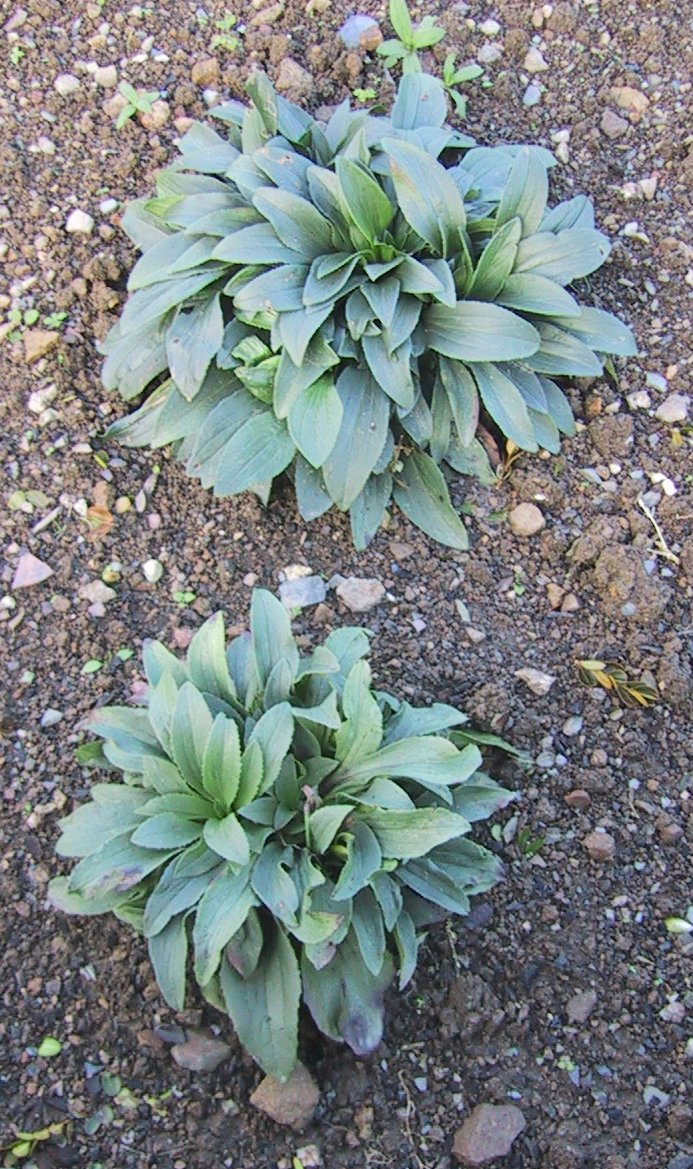

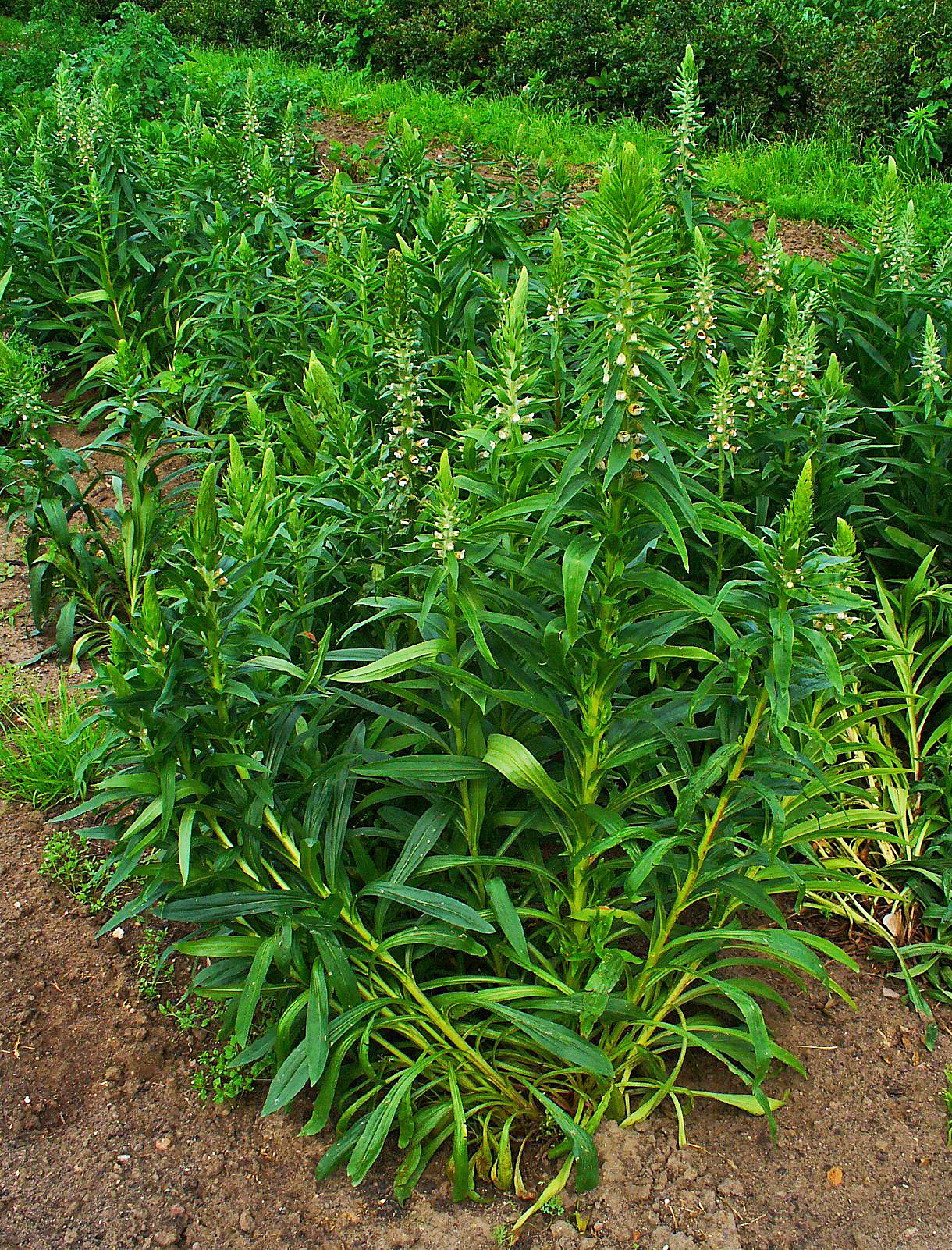

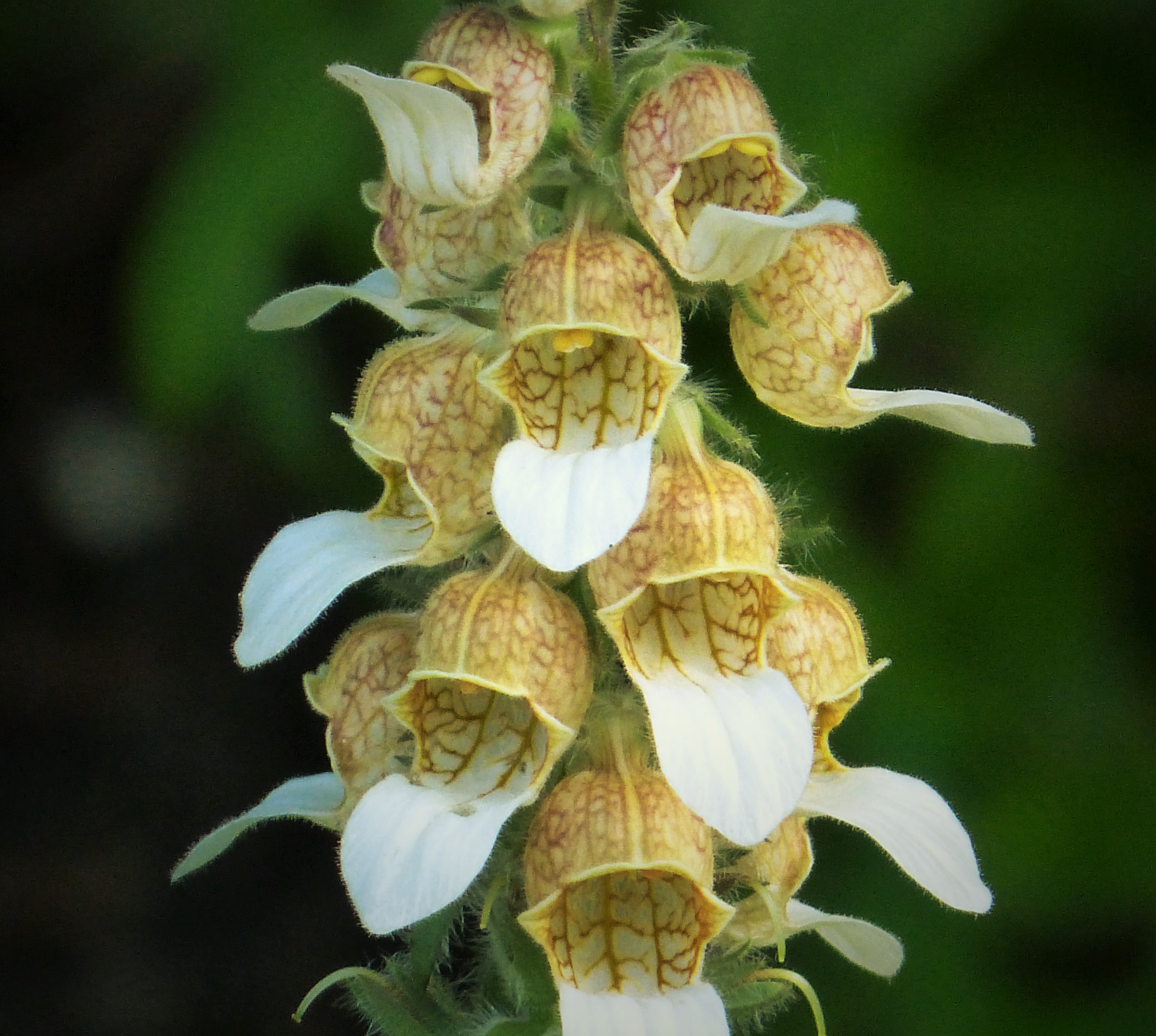

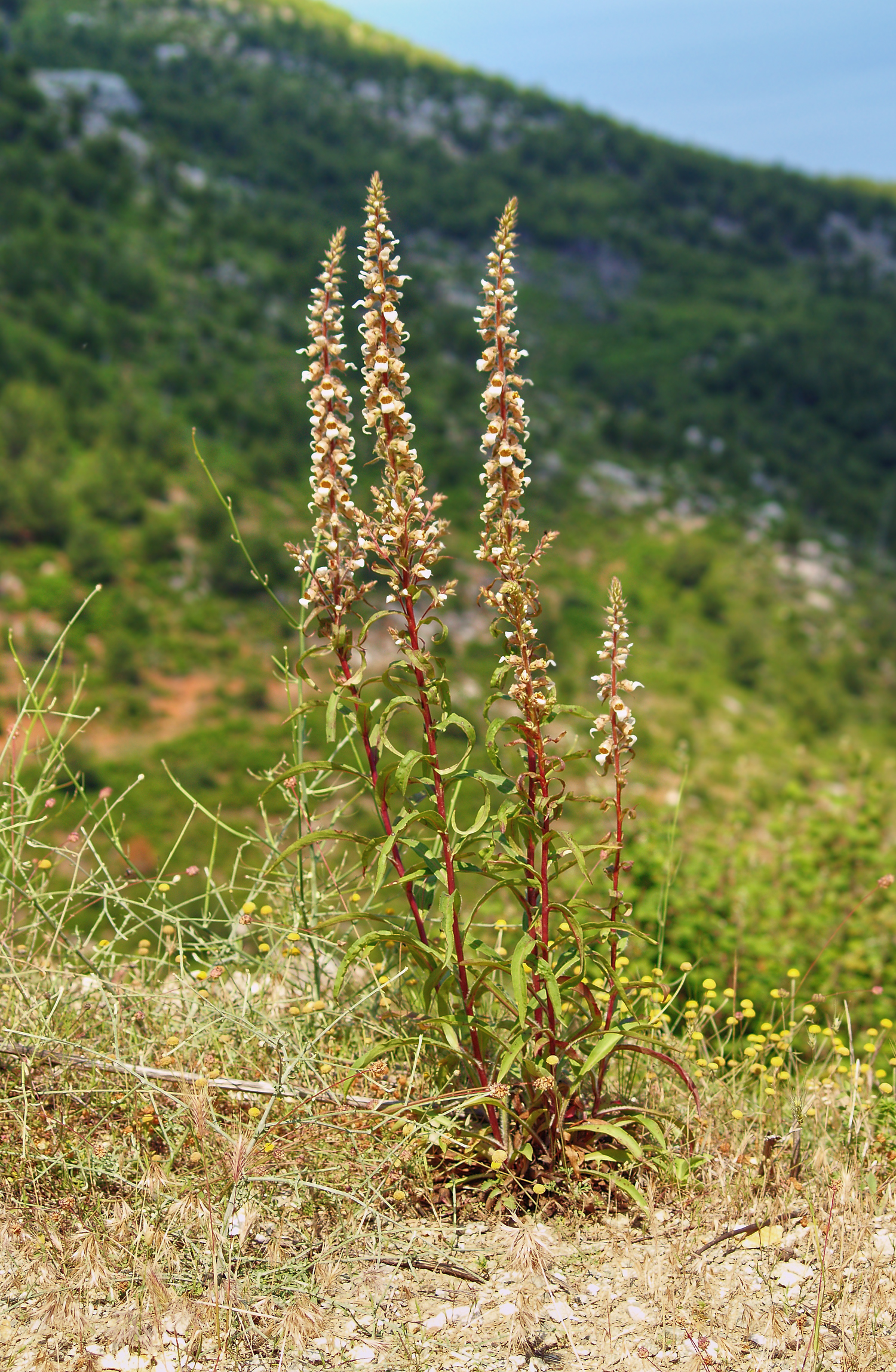

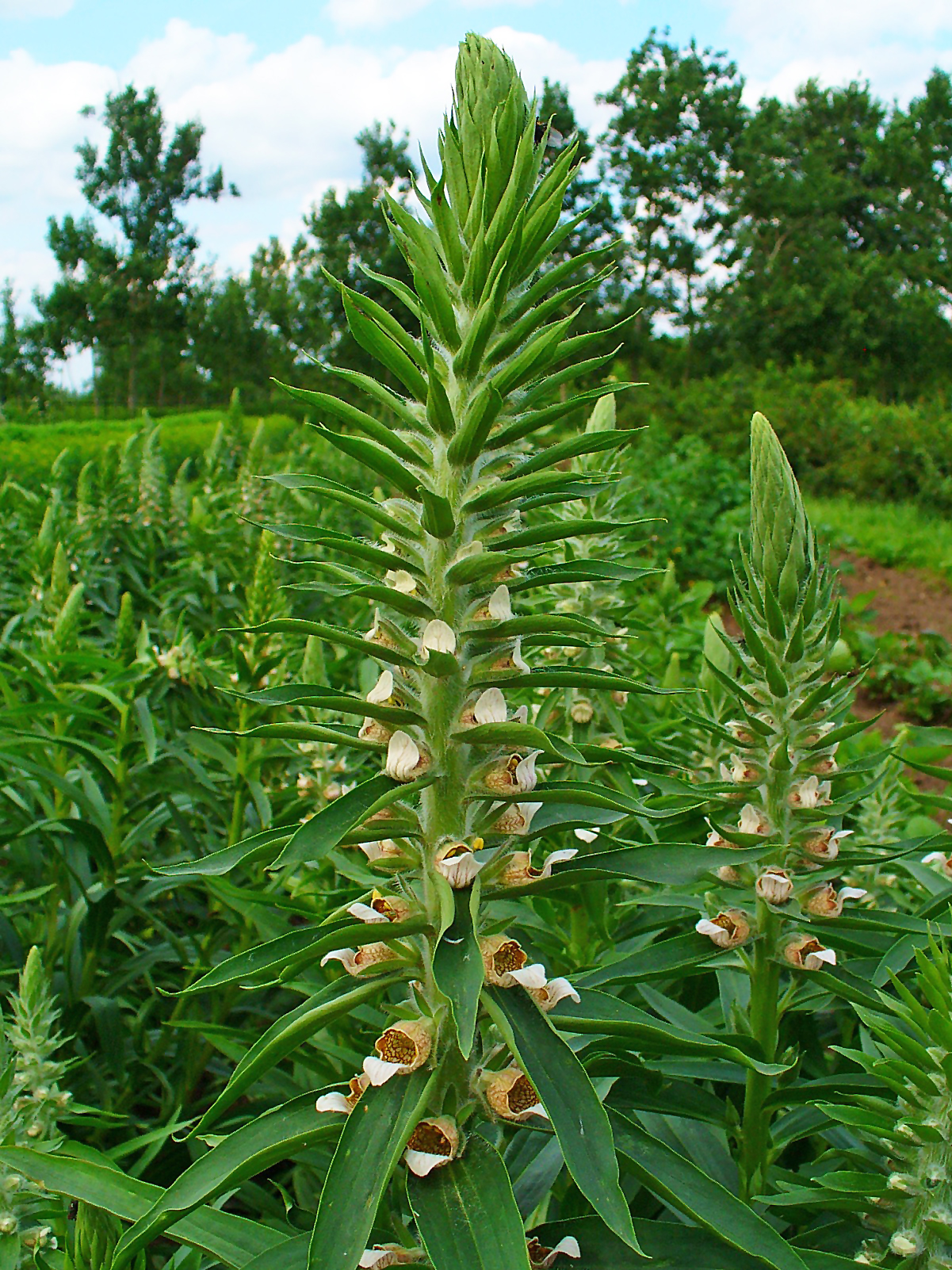

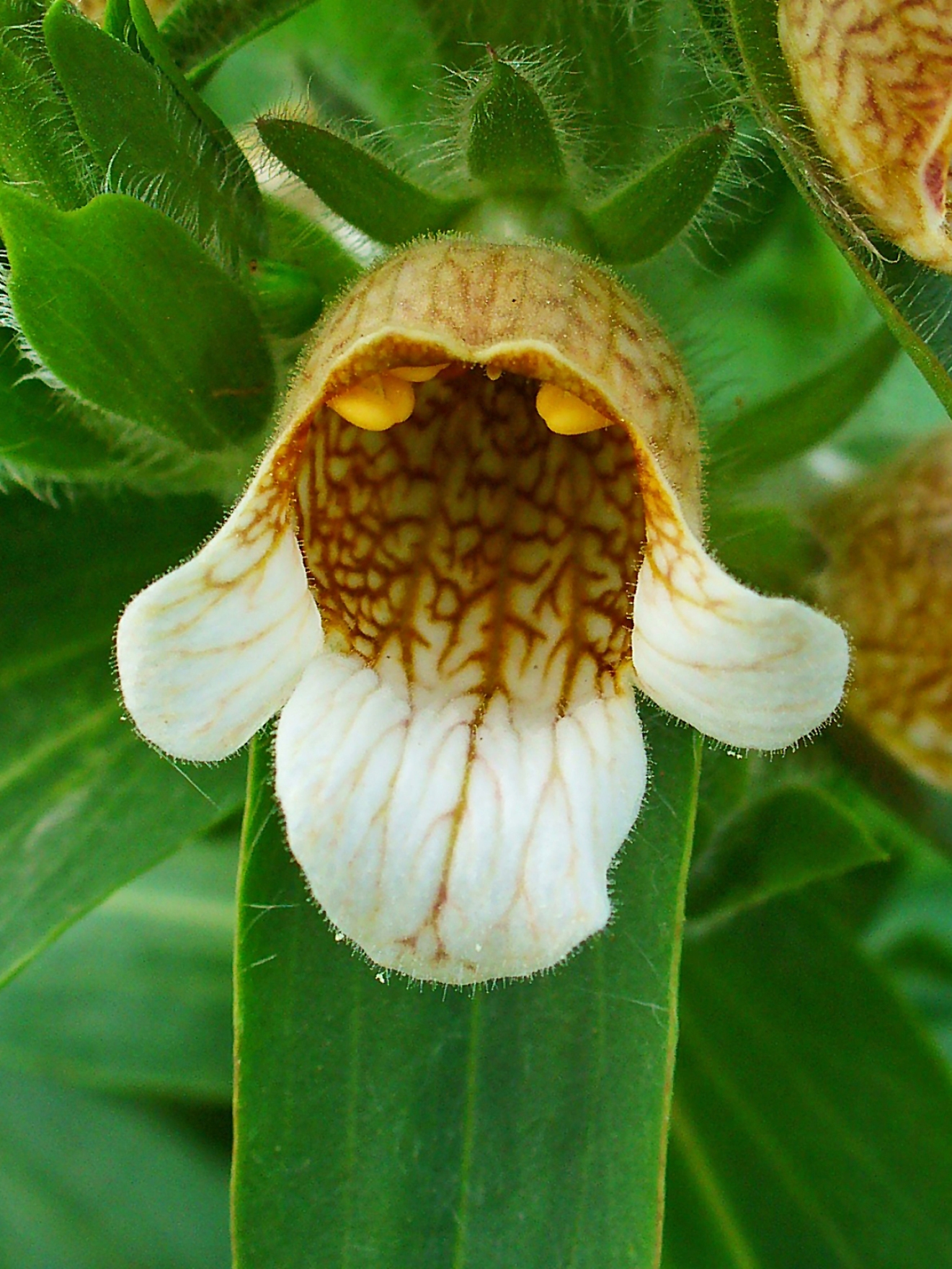

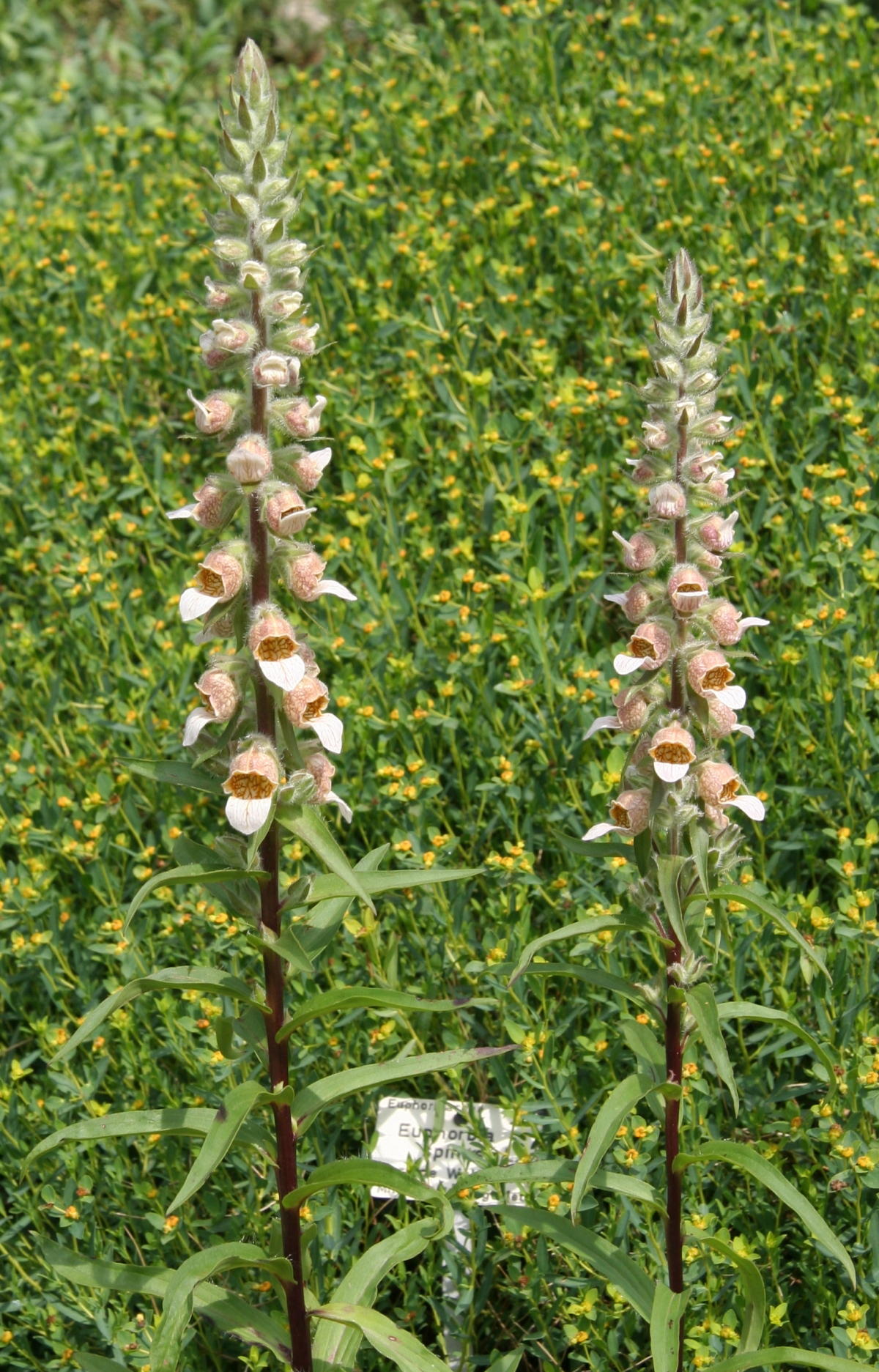

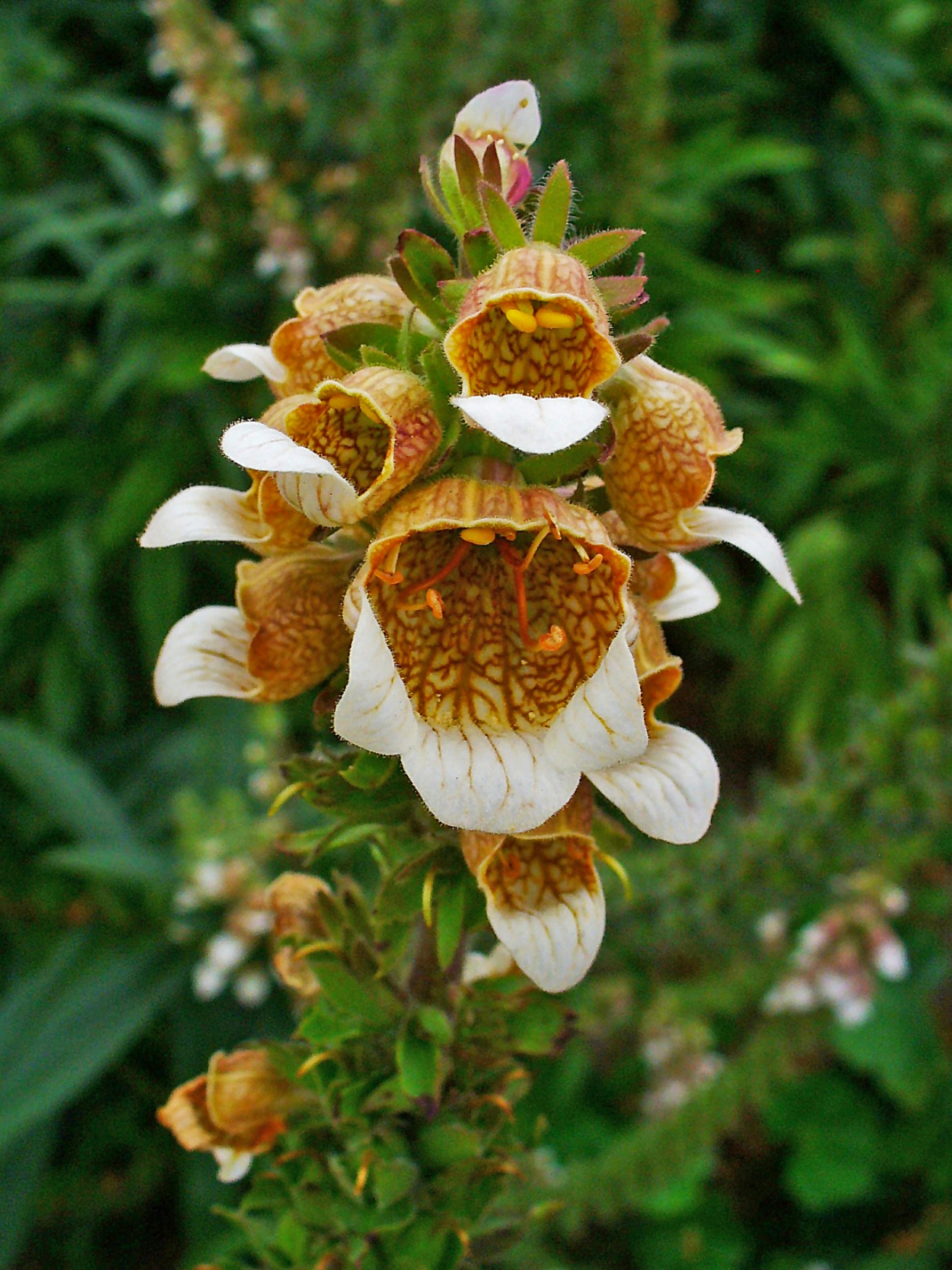
