= Tomatine =

α-tomatine

Names
- IUPAC name (22S,25S)-5α-spirosolan-3β-yl β-D-glucopyranosyl-(1→2)-[β-D-xylopyranosyl-(1→3)]-β-D-glucopyranosyl-(1→4)-β-D-galactopyranoside
- Other names Tomatine, Tomatin, Lycopersicin

Identifiers
CAS Number	17406-45-0
3D model (JSmol)	Interactive image
ChEBI	CHEBI:9630
ChEMBL	ChEMBL525778
ChemSpider	26536
ECHA InfoCard	100.037.647
PubChem CID	28523
UNII	31U6547O08
CompTox Dashboard (EPA)	DTXSID5040413
- InChI: InChI=1S/C50H83NO21/c1-20-7-12-50(51-15-20)21(2)32-28(72-50)14-26-24-6-5-22-13-23(8-10-48(22,3)25(24)9-11-49(26,32)4)65-45-40(63)37(60)41(31(18-54)68-45)69-47-43(71-46-39(62)36(59)34(57)29(16-52)66-46)42(35(58)30(17-53)67-47)70-44-38(61)33(56)27(55)19-64-44/h20-47,51-63H,5-19H2,1-4H3/t20-,21-,22-,23-,24+,25-,26-,27+,28-,29+,30+,31+,32-,33-,34+,35+,36-,37+,38+,39+,40+,41-,42-,43+,44-,45+,46-,47-,48-,49-,50-/m0/s1 Key: REJLGAUYTKNVJM-SGXCCWNXSA-N
- SMILES: C[C@H]1CC[C@]2([C@H]([C@H]3[C@@H](O2)C[C@@H]4[C@@]3(CC[C@H]5[C@H]4CC[C@@H]6[C@@]5(CC[C@@H](C6)O[C@H]7[C@@H]([C@H]([C@H]([C@H](O7)CO)O[C@H]8[C@@H]([C@H]([C@@H]([C@H](O8)CO)O)O[C@H]9[C@@H]([C@H]([C@@H](CO9)O)O)O)O[C@H]2[C@@H]([C@H]([C@@H]([C@H](O2)CO)O)O)O)O)O)C)C)C)NC1

Properties
Chemical formula	C_{50}H_{83}NO_{21}
Molar mass	1034.18816
Appearance	crystalline solid
Melting point	263–268 °C
Solubility in water	insoluble but soluble in methanol, ethanol, dioxane and propylene glycol
- Except where otherwise noted, data are given for materials in their standard state (at 25 °C [77 °F], 100 kPa). verify (what is ?) Infobox references

Tomatine (sometimes called tomatin or lycopersicin) is a glycoalkaloid, found in the stems and leaves of tomato plants, and in the fruits at much lower concentrations. Chemically pure tomatine is a white crystalline solid at standard temperature and pressure.

Tomatine is sometimes confused with the glycoalkaloid solanine.

== History ==
Tomatoes were brought to Europe in the early 1500s. The English botanist John Gerard was one of the first cultivators of the tomato plant. In his publication Grete Herball, he considered tomatoes poisonous due to their levels of what would later be called tomatine, plus high acid content. Consequently, tomatoes were generally not eaten in Britain until the mid-18th century.

In 1837, the first medicinal tomato pills were advertised in the United States because of their positive effects upon the biliary organs. The product "Phelp's Compound Tomato Pills" was extracted from the tomato plant, and contained tomatine. The pills were made by the medic Guy R. Phelps, who stated that the alkaloid tomatine was one of the most useful discoveries ever made. Tomatine then was said to be an antidote to mercury.

In the mid 20th century, scientists from the US Department of Agriculture were the first to isolate tomatine from the wild tomato species Lycopersicon pimpinellifolium and the cultured species Lycopersicon esculentum.

== Structure and biosynthesis ==
Figure 1: Biosynthesis of α-tomatine (26) and other steroidal glycoalkaloids in Solanaceae species.

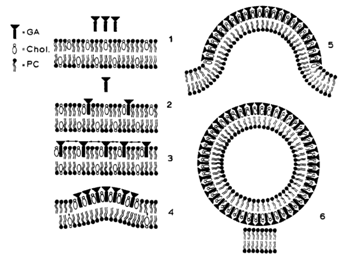
Figure 2: Mechanism of membrane disruption by glycoalkaloids

Alpha-tomatine (α-tomatine) belongs to the compound group steroidal glycoalkaloids. These compounds consist of an aglycon, which is a cholesterol derivative, and a carbohydrate chain, which in the case of α-tomatine consists of two d-glucose units, a d-galactose unit, and a d-xylose unit. In α-tomatine, the tetrasaccharide called lycotetraose is attached to the O-3 of the steroidal aglycone. At first it was thought that the synthesis of steroidal alkaloids only involved multiple steps of hydroxylation, oxidation and amination of cholesterol with arginine as the source of the incorporated nitrogen. Later the glycoalkaloid metabolism genes were discovered. These genes produce the glycoalkaloid metabolism enzymes, which are responsible for the synthesis of steroidal alkaloid aglycones in potato and tomato plants. The reaction these enzymes perform are shown in the figure 1.

== Mechanism of action ==
Tomatine may play a major role in resistance of the tomato plant against fungal, microbial, insect, and herbivoral attack.

The effects of the glycoalkaloids (to which tomatine belongs), can be divided in two main parts: the disruption of cellular membranes and the inhibition of the enzyme acetylcholinesterase. Tomatine is responsible in tomato plants for resistance against animals such as snails and the Colorado beetle. It is also a defense against fungi.

=== Membrane disruption ===
The membrane disruptive properties of tomatine are caused by the ability to form 1:1 complexes with cholesterol. A possible mechanism of the membrane disruption by glycoalkaloids is displayed in figure 2. First, the aglycon part of tomatine binds reversibly to sterols in the membrane (figure 2, part 2). When this reaches a certain density, the glycosidic residues of the glycoalkaloids interact with each other by electrostatic interactions. This interaction catalyzes the development of an irreversible matrix of glycoalkaloid-sterol complexes (figure 2, part 4). In this way, the sterols from the external membrane are immobilized and membrane budding will arise. Tubular structures are formed, because of the structure of tomatine (figure 2, part 6). This membrane disruption causes cell death by cell leakage. Also, the disrupted membrane has an influence on sodium transport, by altering the membrane potential and reducing active sodium transport. When tomatine is orally ingested, the brush border of the intestine is damaged by the membrane-disruptive properties of tomatine, so increased uptake of macromolecules occurs. This damage to the epithelial barriers is dose-dependent.

Tomatine is considered to be a fungitoxic compound, as it completely inhibits mycelial growth of the fungi C. orbiculare (MC100=2.0 mM), S. linicola (MC100=0.4 mM), and H. turcicum (MC100=0.13 mM). For the inhibition at a low pH, much more tomatine is required, so the compound is more effectively fungitoxic at a high pH, when the alkaloid is unprotonated. The unprotonated form of tomatine forms complexes with sterols such as cholesterol, which may cause disruption of cell membrane and changes in membrane permeability.

Tomatine is effective against fungi at pH 8 but not at pH 4. A possible explanation for this is that the tomatine only in the deprotonated form binds to cholesterol to form the earlier mentioned complexes. Tomatine disrupts liposome membranes containing 3-β-hydroxy sterol, while liposomes without 3-β-hydroxy sterols are resistant to membrane disruption. Tomatine inhibits also the fungal types Ph. infestans and Py. aphanidermatum, which do not have any sterols in their membranes, so another mechanism of action must be present.

=== Inhibition of acetylcholinesterase ===
The other known action of the compound is the pH-dependent competitive inhibition of the enzyme acetylcholinesterase. The majority of synthetic pesticides used in agriculture work by inhibition of acetylcholinesterase to kill insects.

== Metabolism ==
Little is known about the bioavailability, pharmacokinetics and metabolism of the glycoalkaloids in humans. One important factor is the poor uptake of tomatine into general blood circulation. When tomatine is orally ingested, much tomatine may form complexes with cholesterol from the other food present in the stomach. The complexes of tomatine and cholesterol are not absorbed in the intestine, but are excreted. For the complexation with cholesterol to occur, the presence of a carbohydrate chain is essential. The aglycon tomatidine, which is tomatine without the sugars, does not form the complexes. The complexation probably occurs in the duodenum, because the acidic conditions in the stomach itself lead to protonation of the tomatine, and the protonated form of tomatine does not bind to cholesterol.

Hydrolysis of tomatine likely takes place, but whether it is acid- or glycosidase-catalyzed is not known. The hydroxylation of tomatine likely leads to the formation of tomatidine, which is the aglycon of tomatine. Tomatidine is a metabolite which may not be completely nontoxic; it could have effects on the human body.

Fungal tomatinase enzymes can transform tomatine to deactivate it. Detoxification can take place by removing one glucose residue. Other fungal species hydrolyze tomatine to the less toxic aglycon tomatidine by removing all the sugar residues. Tomatidine can still inhibit some fungal species, but is less toxic than tomatine. Fungi use diverse pathways for the hydrolysis of tomatine. Also, the level of toxicity depends on the type of fungus. The metabolite tomatidine can be hydrolyzed further by membrane-bound CYP-450 oxygenases.

== Uses ==
Tomatine has been used as a reagent in analytical chemistry for precipitating cholesterol from solution. Also, tomatine is known to be an immune adjuvant in connection with certain protein antigens.

== Toxicity ==
The possible risks of tomatine for humans have not been formally studied, so no NOAEL can be deduced. The toxicity of tomatine has only been studied on laboratory animals. The symptoms of acute tomatine poisoning in animals are similar to the symptoms of poisoning by solanine, a potato glycoalkaloid. These symptoms include vomiting, diarrhea, abdominal pain, drowsiness, confusion, weakness, and depression. Generally, tomatine is regarded to cause less toxic effects to mammals than other alkaloids such as solanine.

The human consumption of moderate amounts of tomatine seems to occur without notable toxic effects. This is reinforced by the widespread consumption of "pickled green" and "fried green tomatoes" and the consumption of high-tomatine tomatoes (a variant of L. esculentum var. cerasiforme, better known as the "cherry tomato", indigenous to Peru) with very high tomatine content (in the range of 500–5000 μg/kg of dry weight).

New York Times food science writer Harold McGee found scant evidence for tomato toxicity in the medical and veterinary literature, and observed that dried tomato leaves (which contain higher concentrations of alkaloids than the fruits) are occasionally used as a food flavoring or garnish, without problems. He also reported that an adult human would probably have to eat over half a kilogram of tomato leaves to ingest a toxic (not necessarily lethal) dose.

== See also ==
- Chaconine
- Solanine
