= Aglycone =

Chemical compound

Chemical structures of digoxin (top) and its aglycone
digoxigenin (bottom)

An aglycone (aglycon or genin) is the chemical compound remaining after the glycosyl group on a glycoside is replaced by a hydrogen atom. For example, the aglycone of a cardiac glycoside would be a steroid molecule.

== Detection ==
Samples of glycones and glycosides from limonoids can be simultaneously quantified through a high performance liquid chromatography (HPLC) method, where a binary solvent system and a diode array detector separate and detect them at a sensitivity of 0.25-0.50 μg.

== Clinical significance ==
A study on molecular markers in human aortic endothelial cells published that urolithin A aglycone stopped cell migration but not monocyte adhesion, which is the initial step of atherosclerotic plaque formation. Another study exploring the benefits of extra virgin olive oil consumption in preventing age-related neurodegenerative diseases found oleuropein aglycone greatly increased the cognitive performance of mice. The aglycone-fed mice displayed strong autophagic reactions, mTOR regulation, and reduced plaque deposits and β-amyloid levels.

== See also ==
- Glucoside
