= Remuroa =

Remuroa is a common name of Maori origin for several plants and may refer to:

- Solanum americanum
- Solanum nigrum, native to Eurasia
