= Erva-moura =

Erva-moura is a common name of Portuguese origin for several plants and may refer to:

- Solanum americanum
- Solanum nigrum
