= Yerba mora =

Yerba mora is a common name of Spanish origin for several plants and may refer to:

- Solanum americanum
- Solanum nigrum, native to Eurasia
