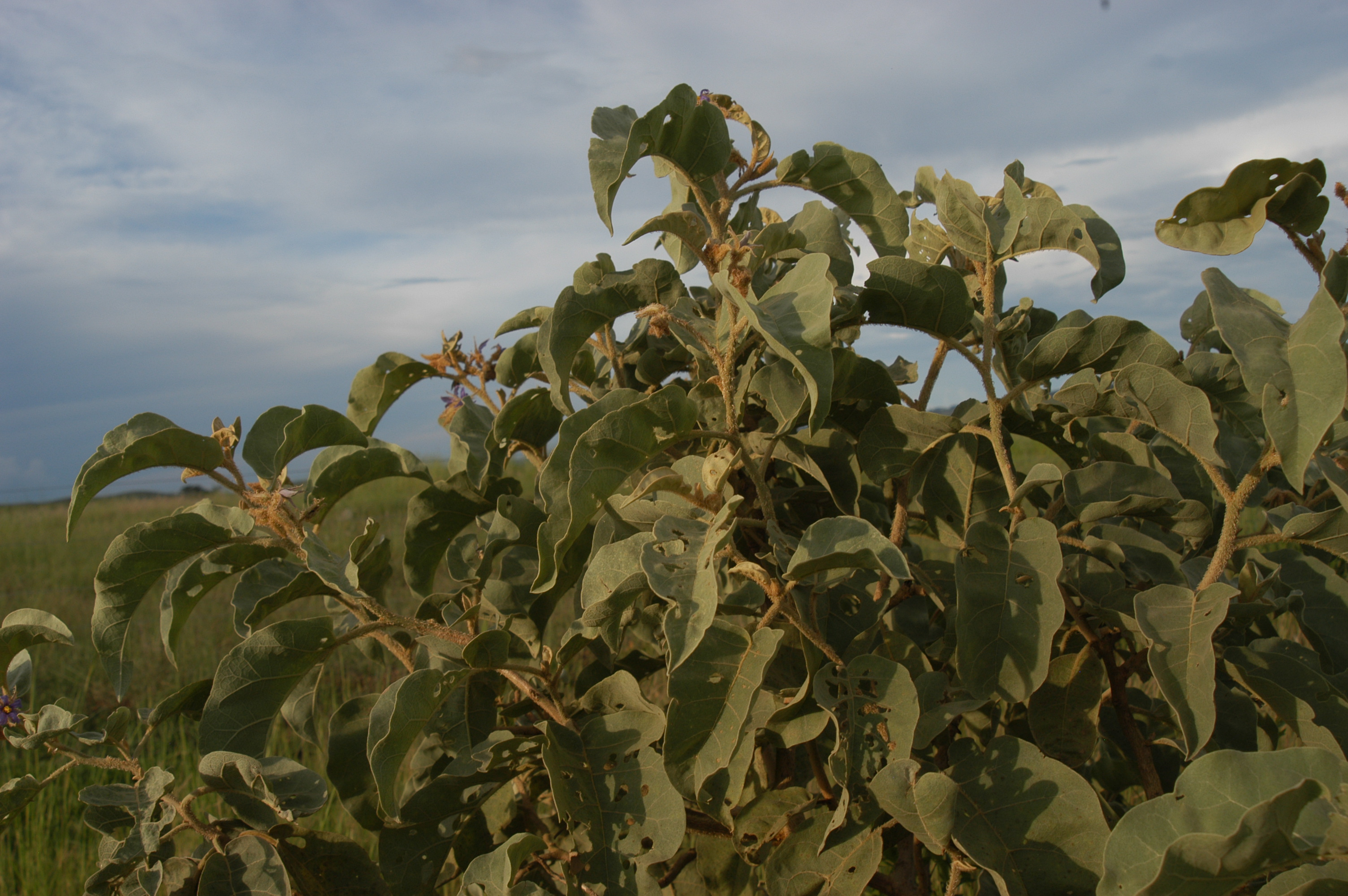

Scientific classification
- Kingdom: Plantae
- Clade: Tracheophytes
- Clade: Angiosperms
- Clade: Eudicots
- Clade: Asterids
- Order: Solanales
- Family: Solanaceae
- Genus: Solanum
- Species: S. lycocarpum

Binomial name
- Solanum lycocarpum A.St.-Hil.

= Solanum lycocarpum =

Species of flowering plant

Solanum lycocarpum, or wolf apple, is a species of nightshade, common in the Brazilian Cerrado ecoregion. In Portuguese, the plant is called lobeira (lit. 'wolf's plant') or fruta-do-lobo ('wolf's fruit'). The name "wolf's apple" comes from the fact that its fruit accounts for more than 50% of maned wolves' diet. Likewise, the scientific name "lycocarpum" is formed from Latinized Greek elements "lyco-", meaning "wolf", and "carpum" meaning "fruit".

== Range ==
The native range of the wolf apple tree is the Brazilian savannah, but it grows also on pastures and disturbed land, such as highway margins, in various parts of Brazil. It prefers moist, clay soil, full sun, and mild temperatures.

== Description ==
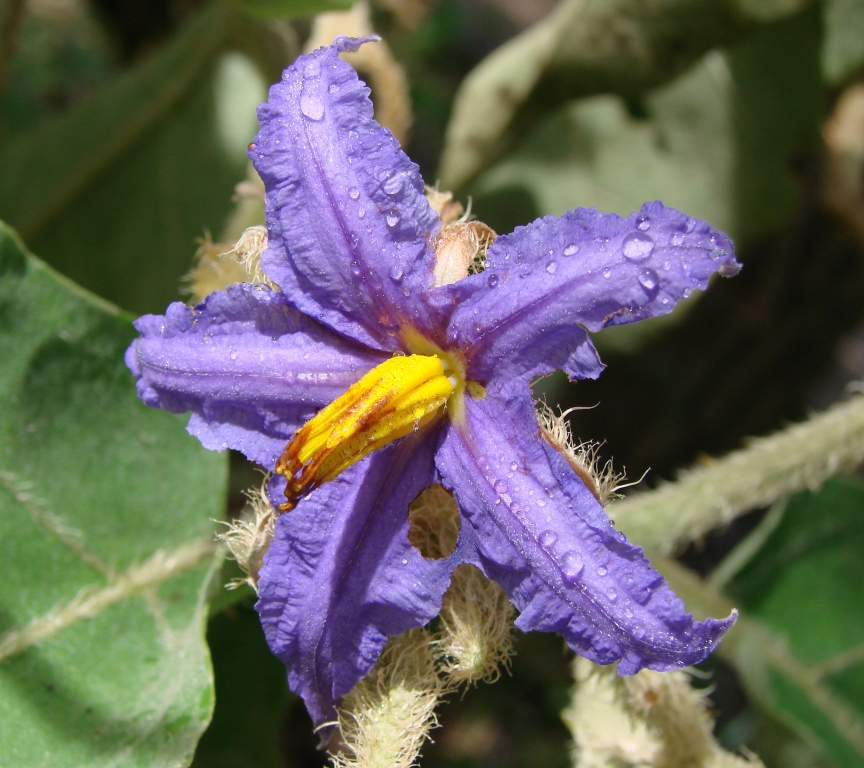
Flower

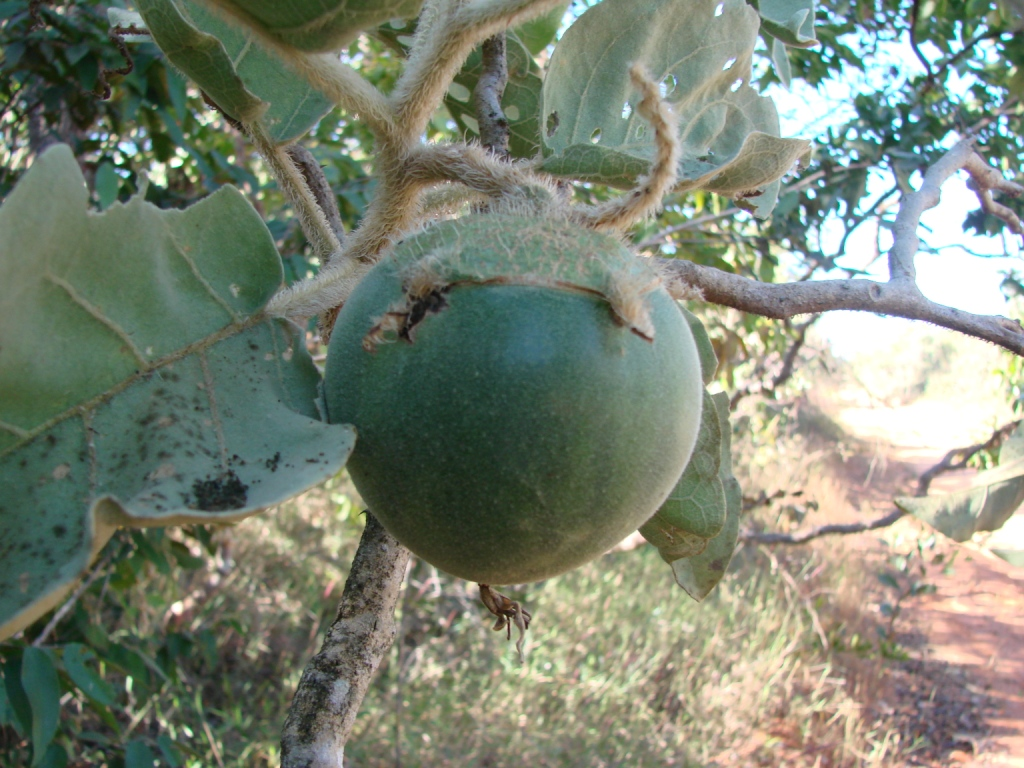
Fruit

The wolf apple plant is a flowering shrub or small tree with round open crown, ranging in height from 1.2 to 5 m (4 to 16 ft). The large leaves are 16 to 28 cm (6 to 11 in) long, simple but deeply lobed, tough, and covered in a soft grey-white fuzz, in alternate disposition.

Plants flower through the year, but more intensely during the dry season, from late fall to early spring. The flowers are similar to those of the bitter nightshade: star-shaped, with five sepals, five blue or purple petals fused at the base, and five large yellow anthers that release pollen through an opening at the tip. The flowers are arranged in helical monochasal cyme, opening from the base up. Flowers lack nectar, and are either male or hermaphroditic. The latter produce fruit after cross-pollination by several species of pollen-collecting bees, including Xylocopa virescens, X. frontalis, Oxaea flavescens, Centris scopipes, C. fuscata, Bombus morio, Exomalopsis sp., Pseudaugochloropsis graminea, Apis mellifera, and Megachile benigna.

Fruit production occurs mostly between December and January. The fruits are large, up to 20 cm (8 in) in diameter and weighing 900 g (2 lb) or more, and contain up to 500 dark brown comma-shaped seeds, about 7 mm × 5 mm × 2 mm (1/4 in × 3/16 in × 1/16 in). The rind is thin and lustrous, and remains green even after ripening. The pulp is yellowish, soft, sweetish and extremely aromatic. They resemble the tomato in external shape and internal morphology, but also the eggplant for the texture and color of the flesh. The maned wolf is an important seed-spreading agent.

== Uses ==
=== Culinary use ===
The ripe fruits are edible to humans, and are consumed by local populations in jams and preserves, but the unripe fruits are quite astringent or bitter due to a rich tannin content. The fruits are used as a fallback source of food for cattle in the dry season.

At the onset of maturation, the whole fruit contains 85% moisture (by weight), 5% starch, and 10% other residue. The dry pulp, without peel and seeds, yields over 50% starch, more than cassava. The starch is locally separated by blending the fruit with water and straining.

The pulp of the ripe fruit contains about 75% moisture, 11% carbohydrate, 1% fat, 1% protein, 1% ash, 2.5% soluble fiber, and 2% insoluble fiber. The main volatiles in the ripe fruit are hexanal (which has the scent of grass) and ethyl butanoate (scent of apple), although dozens of other compounds contribute to the fruit's aroma.

All other parts of the plant are poisonous to humans. However, the leaves are eaten by cattle, and are also an important food source for the bat Platyrrhinus lineatus.

=== Medicine ===
Currently, there are no proven medicinal uses for the wolf apple, but the plant is used in the local folk medicine for obesity, cholesterol reduction, and as a treatment for diabetes. About 30% of the starch extracted from almost-ripe fruits, which has been sold commercially as capsules, is digestion-resistant, which seems to be the rationale for these popular uses. High-fiber Solanum lycocarpum flour was found to reduce diabetes symptoms in diabetic rats; however, the starch did not show such effect.

The fruit contains about 1.5% of glycoalkaloids in its dried fruits, chiefly solamargine and solasonine, mostly in the peel and seeds. Extracts have been shown to kill in vitro the human parasites Schistosoma mansoni and Giardia lamblia, Leishmania amazonensis, and Leishmania infantum. The main phenolic compounds in ethanol extracts of the ripe fruits are caffeic acid and chlorogenic acid.

It is believed that the fruits protect the maned wolf from infection of the giant kidney worm, which is usually fatal for the animal.

Solanum lycocarpum fruit extracts have also been shown to kill larvae of the Culex mosquito.

== Pests ==
The wolf apple tree is the natural host of the larva of the butterfly Leucanella memusae. Contact with the urticating bristles of this caterpillar may result in severe dermatitis and hemorrhage.

The weevil Collabismus clitellae lays eggs into stems of the plant, causing the formation of galls, with measurable harmful effect on the plant's growth and fruit production.
