= Dutch eggplant =

Dutch eggplant is a common name for several plants and may refer to:

- Solanum betaceum (also known by the common name tamarillo)
- Solanum aculeatissimum
