= S. nigrum =

S. nigrum is an abbreviation of a species name. In binomial nomenclature the name of a species is always the name of the genus to which the species belongs, followed by the species name (also called the species epithet). In S. nigrum the genus name has been abbreviated to S. and the species has been spelled out in full. In a document that uses this abbreviation it should always be clear from the context which genus name has been abbreviated.

The Latin species epithet nigrum means "black". Some of the most common uses of S. nigrum are:

- Solanum nigrum, the European black nightshade
- Sorghum nigrum, a synonym of Sorghum bicolor
