= C45H73NO15 =

The molecular formula C_{45}H_{73}NO_{15} (molar mass: 868.06 g/mol, exact mass: 867.4980 u) may refer to:

- Solamargine
- Solanine
