= Coramsine =

Abandoned experimental cancer drug

Coramsine (SBP002) was an experimental cancer drug that was evaluated in preliminary clinical trials, but was abandoned by Solbec Pharmaceuticals Ltd after the results were insufficient for them to raise investment capital to continue its development.

== Composition ==
Coramsine is a chemotherapeutic and immunomodulating agent whose primary ingredients are two solasodine glycoalkaloids, solasonine and solamargine, which are derived from the plant Solanum linnaeanum (devil's apple).

== History ==
The study of glycoalkaloids as potential anti-cancer agents began with Queensland researcher Bill Cham in the late 1970s. Cham heard reports from farmers that topical application of the Devil's Apple plant was effective in slowing the growth of various skin cancers on horses and cattle.

Animal studies and in vitro studies showed positive results, however Cham decided to focus his energies on developing the glycoalkaloid mixture, patented as BEC, as a topical cream for non-melanoma skin cancer.

In 2000, Solbec Pharmaceuticals Ltd. licensed the intellectual property rights to BEC from Cham and after it displayed good results against peritoneal mesothelioma in animals. Solbec initiated human trials which also yielded encouraging results. Other researchers have also demonstrated antiproliferative activity of steroidal glycosides against cancer cells.

During 2005 and 2006 Solbec was granted orphan drug designation for Coramsine by the U.S. Food and Drug Administration in the treatment of renal cell carcinoma and for melanoma respectively. 2006 also saw the completion of Phase I/IIa trials and the commissioning of Phase IIb trials that would target renal cell carcinoma (stage III/IV) and melanoma (stage III/IV), but in November 2006 shortly before their commencement Solbec postponed the trials due to Australia's Therapeutic Goods Administration (TGA) having concerns about the drug's pre-clinical data. A development plan for coramsine was approved by the TGA in May 2007 resulting in further pre-clinical studies, which were successfully completed in March 2008. Solbec unsuccessfully sought a business partner to develop coramsine further, abandoning its development, as they changed the company's direction as well as its legal business name in December 2008, following the Great Recession and credit crunch. The subsequent company licensed the technology back to the original founder, Bill Cham, who manufactures it from his private company in Vanuatu and markets it worldwide via the internet under the name Curaderm BEC5, a cream of solasodine rhamnosyl glycosides (BEC). Curaderm BEC5 has not been approved for medical use by any regulatory agency.

== Mechanism of action ==
Cormasine is thought to kill tumor cells by direct cell lysis, showing selectivity for cancer cells as opposed to healthy cells via a rhamnose binding protein. Coramsine also has the potential to modulate the production of interleukin-6.
