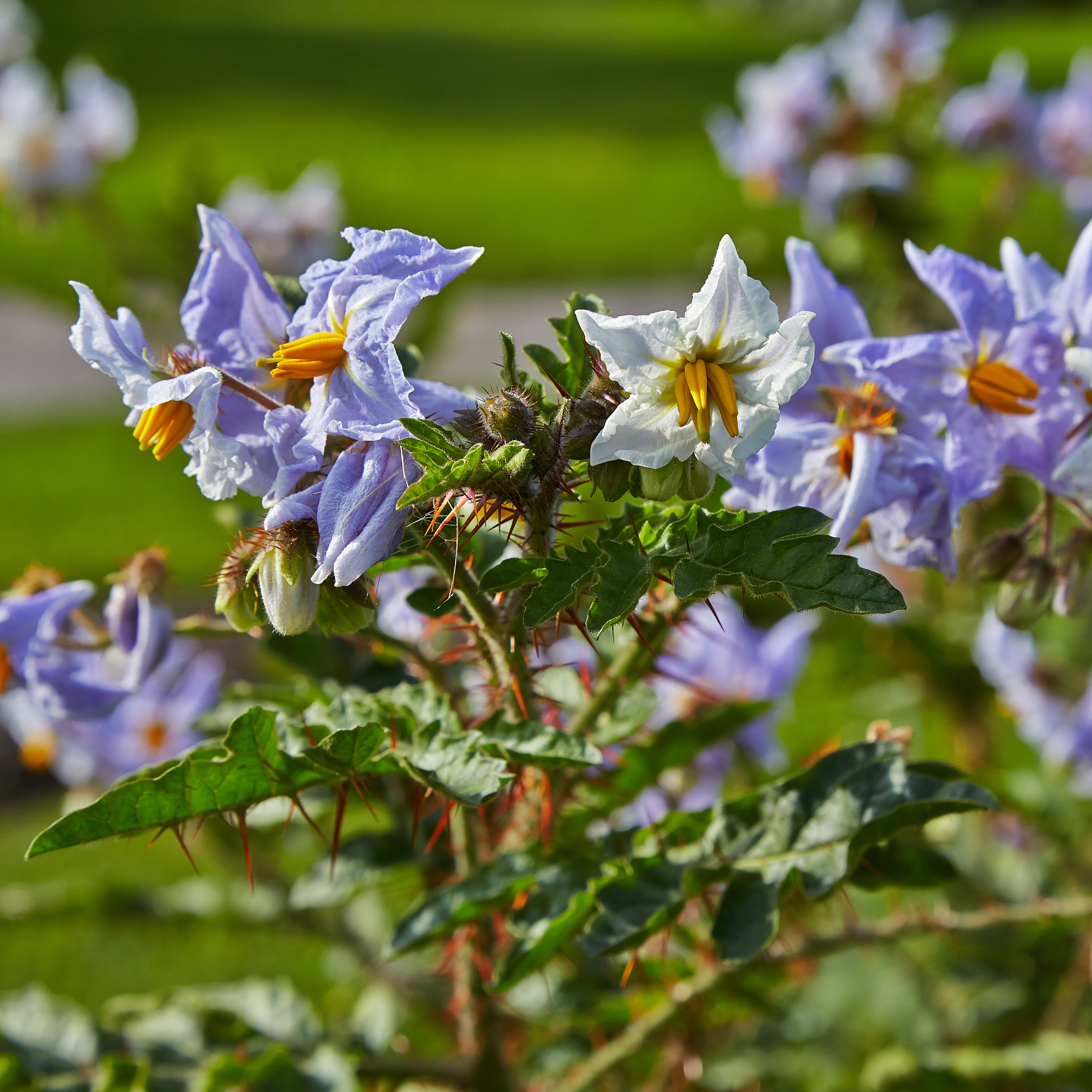

Scientific classification
- Kingdom: Plantae
- Clade: Tracheophytes
- Clade: Angiosperms
- Clade: Eudicots
- Clade: Asterids
- Order: Solanales
- Family: Solanaceae
- Genus: Solanum
- Species: S. sisymbriifolium

Binomial name
- Solanum sisymbriifolium Lam.

Synonyms
- Many, see text

= Solanum sisymbriifolium =

Species of flowering plant

Solanum sisymbriifolium is commonly known as vila-vila, sticky nightshade, red buffalo-bur, the fire-and-ice plant, litchi tomato, or Morelle de Balbis.

The small edible fruits are red on the outside and yellow inside. It grows inside a spiny, green husk. The fruit is ripe when it is easily removed from the stem. The flavor resembles sour cherries and a little bit like a tomato.

This plant has been used as a trap crop to protect potatoes from potato cyst nematode. The stems and leaves contain solasodine which makes the plant very resistant to many pests and diseases, with the exception of potato beetles and tomato hornworms. It can also be used as a hedge plant to keep animals out of a garden, because it is covered with prickles (erroneously called thorns).

== Synonyms ==
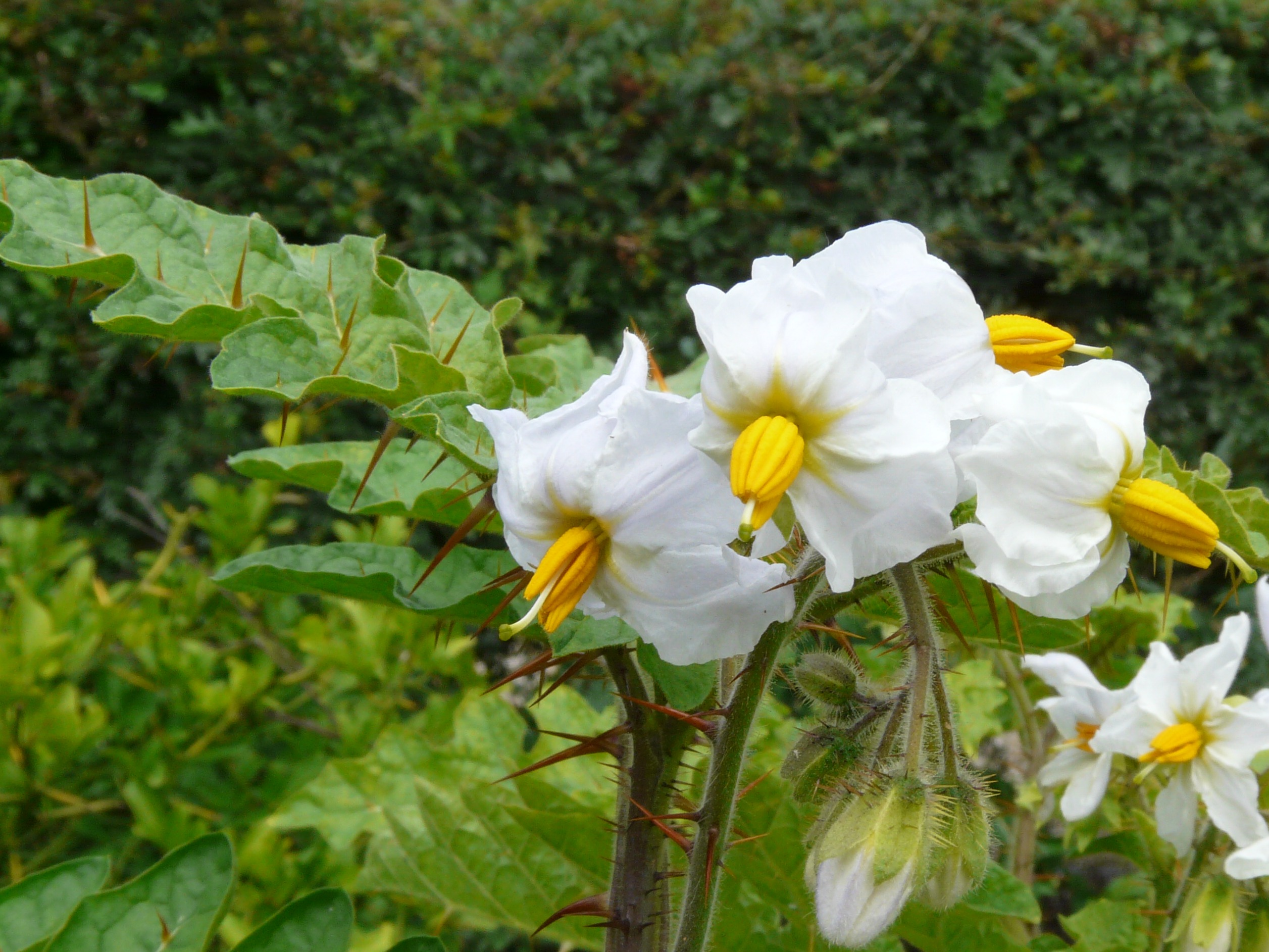
Closeup of flowers

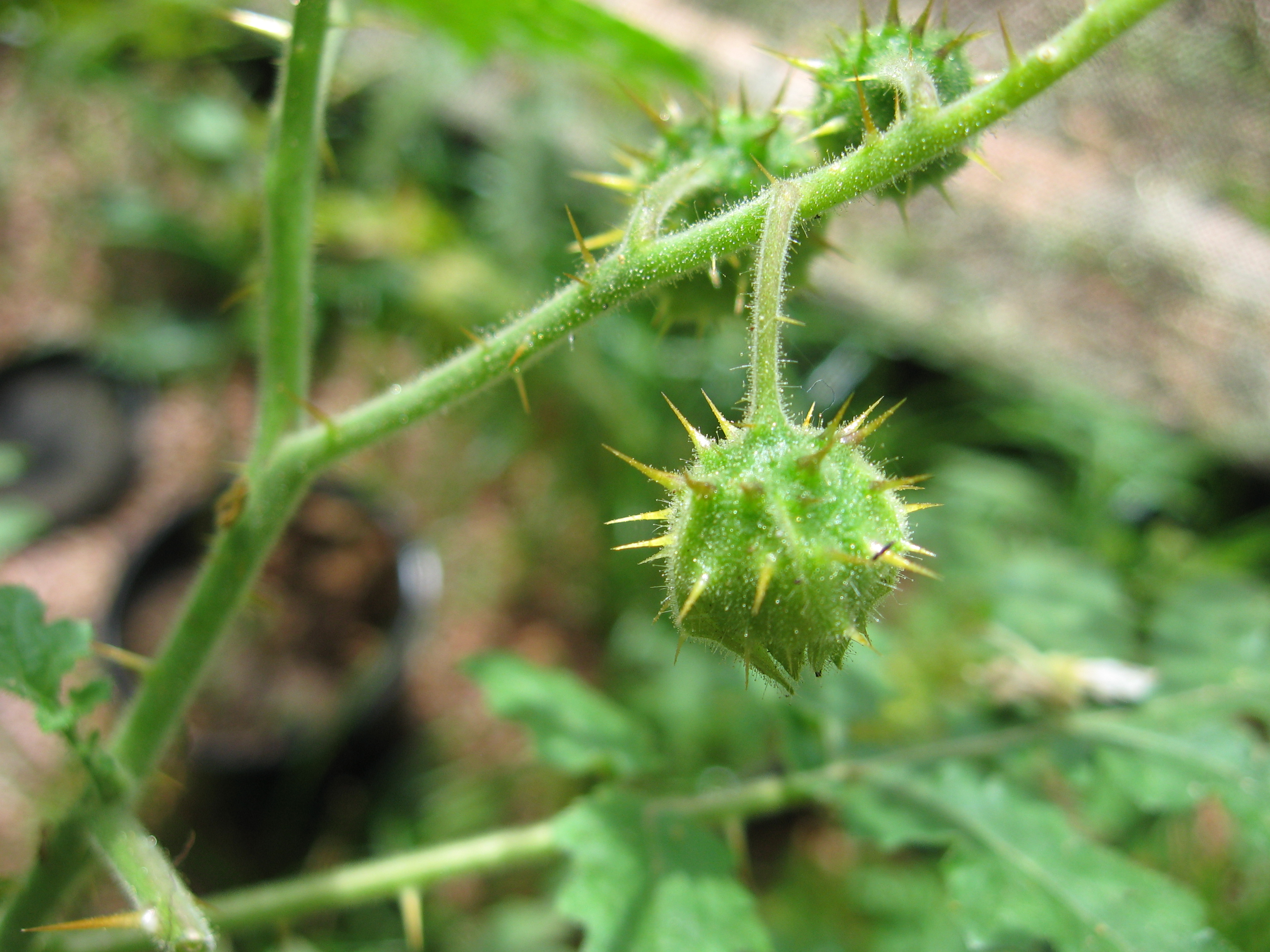
Immature fruit hidden in a spiny husk

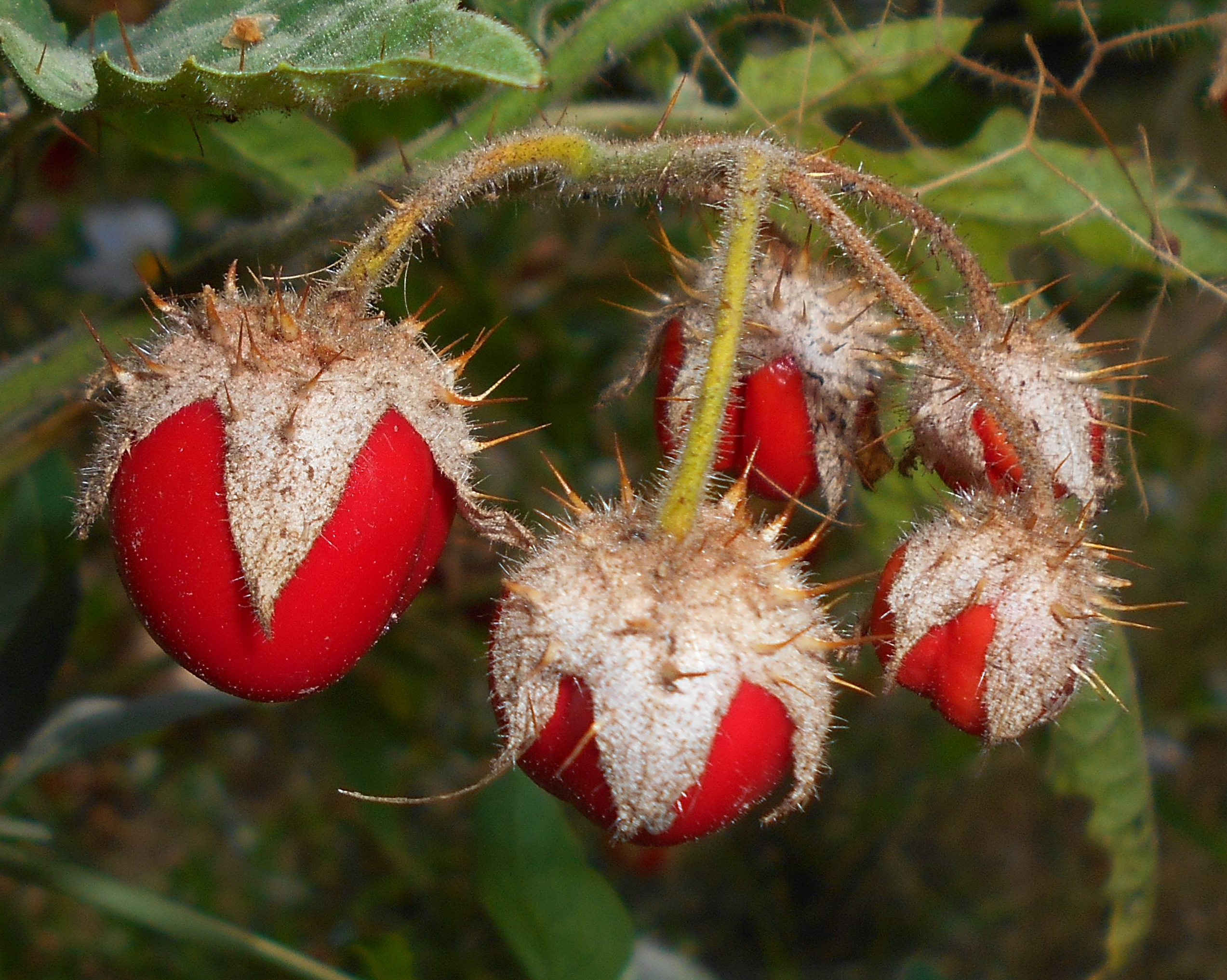
Mature red fruit

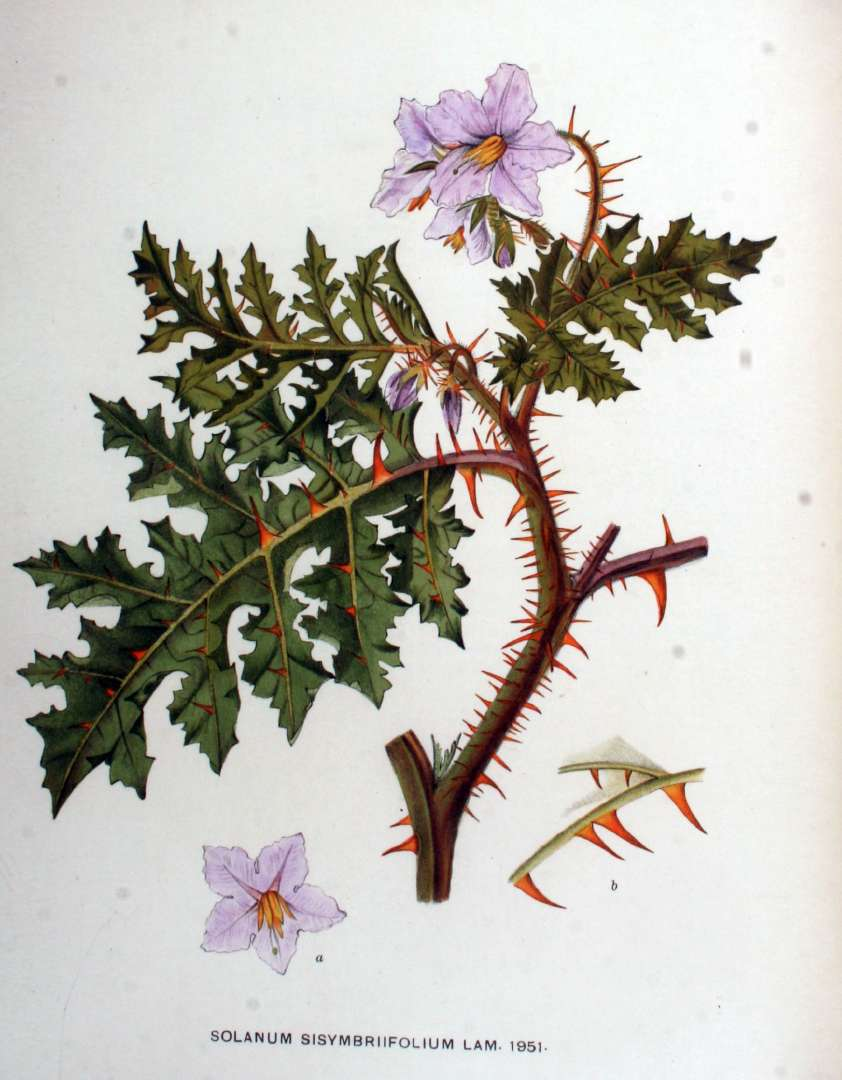

The sticky nightshade has been described under a number of illegitimate scientific names, many of them quite ambiguous homonyms:

- Solanum balbisii Dunal
- Solanum bipinnatifidum Larrañaga
- Solanum brancaefolium Jacq.
- Solanum decurrens Balb.
- Solanum edule Vell.
- Solanum formosum Weinm.
- Solanum inflatum Hornem.
- Solanum mauritianum Willd. ex Roth (preoccupied)
- Solanum opuliflorum Port. ex Walp. (nomen nudum)
- Solanum opuliflorum Port. ex Dunal (nomen nudum)
- Solanum rogersii S.Moore
- Solanum sabeanum Buckley
- Solanum subviscidum Schrank
- Solanum thouinii C.C.Gmel.
- Solanum viscidum Schweigg.
- Solanum viscosum Lag.
- Solanum xanthacanthum Willd. ex Walp. (nomen nudum)

Several forms and varieties have been named, but these are generally not considered distinct today:

- Solanum sisymbriifolium var. purpureiflorum Dunal
- Solanum sisymbriifolium forma albiflorum Kuntze
- Solanum sisymbriifolium var. bipinnatipartitum Dunal
- Solanum sisymbriifolium var. brevilobum Dunal
- Solanum sisymbriifolium var. gracile Mattos
- Solanum sisymbriifolium var. heracleifolium Sendtn.
- Solanum sisymbriifolium forma lilacinum Kuntze
- Solanum sisymbriifolium var. macrocarpum Kuntze
- Solanum sisymbriifolium var. oligospermum (Sendtn.) Dunal

== Distribution ==
=== Native ===
==== South America ====
- Argentina, Bolivia, Chile, Colombia, Ecuador, Paraguay, Peru
- Brazil
  - Rio Grande do Sul

=== Introduced ===
==== Europe ====
- Austria, Belgium, Czech Republic, Denmark, Ireland, Estonia, Finland, France, Germany, Hungary, Latvia, Lithuania, Morocco, Netherlands, Norway, Portugal, Spain, Sweden, Ukraine, United Kingdom
- Italy
  - Sicily - invasive

==== Asia ====
- Republic of Korea
- Bangladesh
- Taiwan
- Japan
- Turkey
- India
  - Gujarat
- China
  - Guangdong, Yunnan

==== Africa ====
- Benin, Kenya, South Africa, Republic of the Congo, Eswatini, Namibia

==== North America ====
- Canada
- Mexico
- United States - ~64% of the country is suitable for S. sisymbriifolium. Predicted to eventually be absent from most of Alaska, Montana, and Wisconsin, and to never enter North Dakota.
  - Alabama, Arizona, California, Delaware, Florida, Georgia, Iowa, Louisiana, Massachusetts, Mississippi, New Jersey, New York, North Carolina, Oregon, Pennsylvania, South Carolina, Texas
  - ABSENT from Idaho

==== Oceania ====
- Australia
  - New South Wales, Victoria, Western Australia
- New Zealand

== Status as an invasive species ==
In South Africa it is listed as a Category 1b invader in the National Environmental Biodiversity Management Act. This means most activities with regards to the species are prohibited and it should be ensured that it does not spread beyond a landowner's domain.
