= Black nightshade =

Black nightshade is a common name for several plants and may refer to:

- Solanum americanum (American black nightshade) of much of North America
- Solanum nigrum (European black nightshade) of Europe
Plants named black nightshade
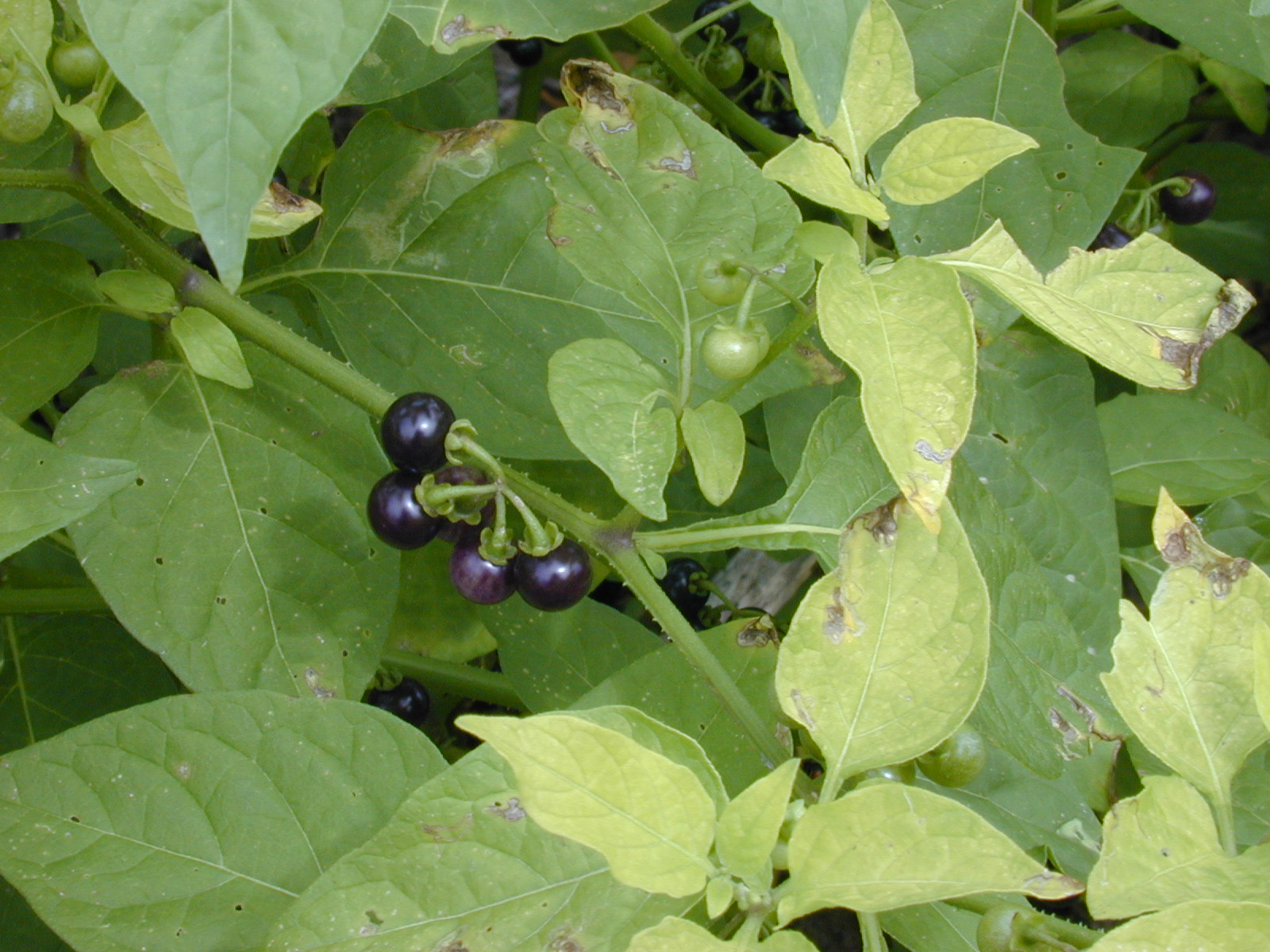
Solanum americanum

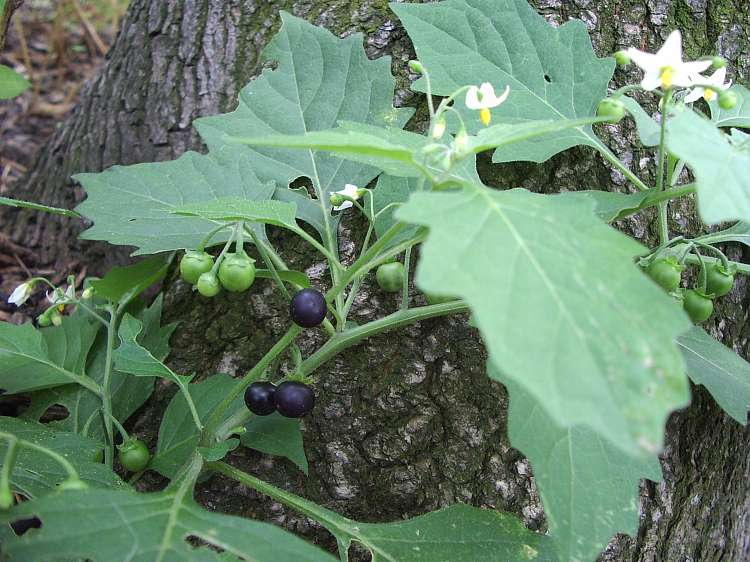
Solanum nigrum
