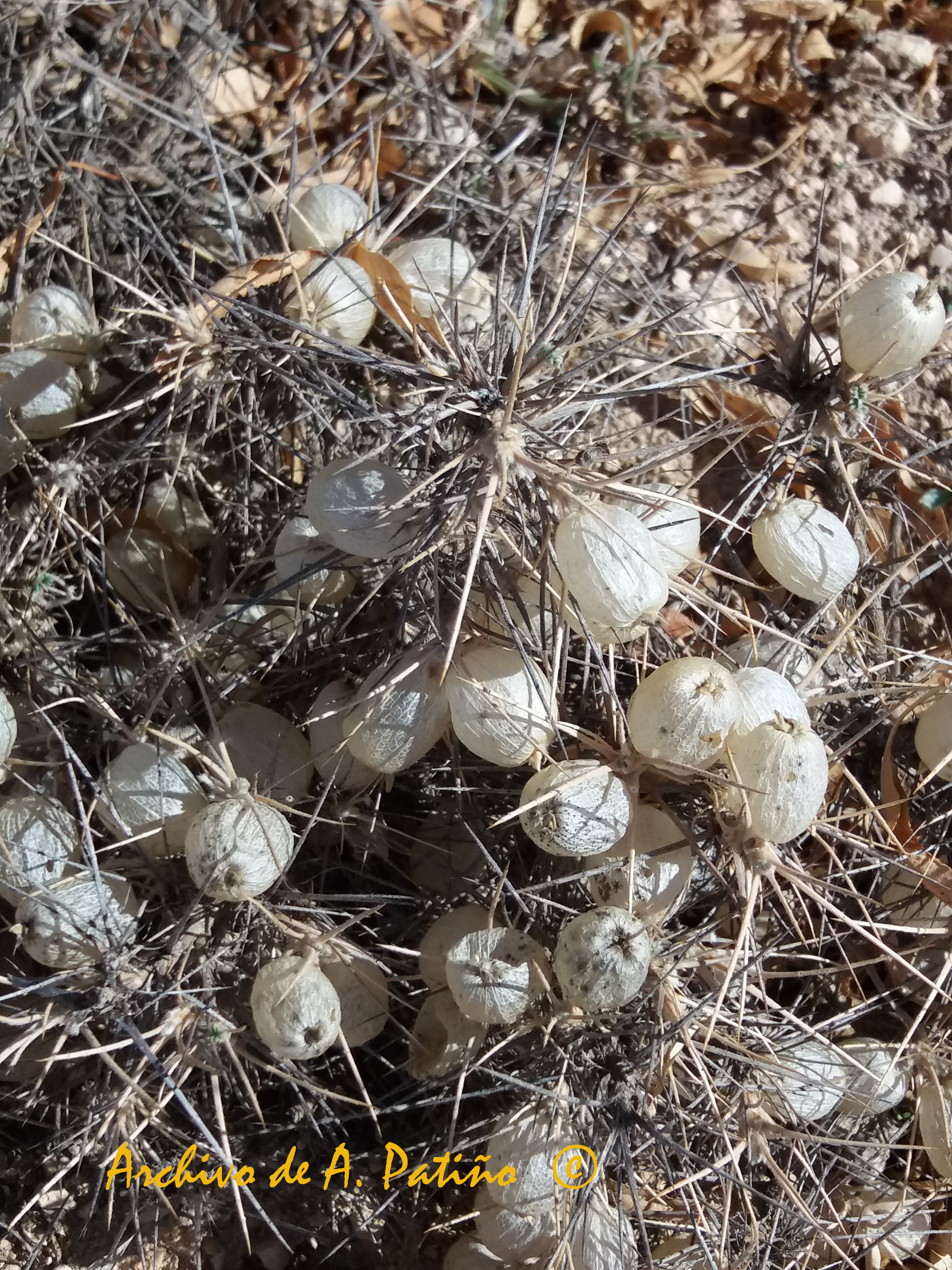

Scientific classification
- Kingdom: Plantae
- Clade: Tracheophytes
- Clade: Angiosperms
- Clade: Eudicots
- Clade: Rosids
- Order: Fabales
- Family: Fabaceae
- Subfamily: Faboideae
- Genus: Astragalus
- Species: A. atropilosulus

Binomial name
- Astragalus atropilosulus (Hochst.) Bunge

Synonyms
- Diplotheca atropilosula Hochst.

= Astragalus atropilosulus =

Species of legume

Astragalus atropilosulus is a perennial herb in the family Fabaceae. It is native to Eastern Africa and some parts of the Arabian Peninsula.

It is used as a vegetable in Malawi and Kenya.

== Description ==
It is a perennial or perhaps sometimes biennial herb. It usually grows between 50-100 cm, but can reach up to 200 cm. The numerous stems are erect or ascending. The rootstock can be up to 2cm in diameter.

It is most commonly found in the months of September, October, and November. It is most commonly found in the country of Ethiopia.

Astragalus atropilosulus has 4 subspecies:

Astragalus atropilosulus var. burkeanus

Astragalus atropilosulus var. abyssinicus

Astragalus atropilosulus var. atropilosulus

Astragalus atropilosulus var. coerulescens

== Uses ==
The leaves are used as a side dish and are sometimes mixed with the leaves of Solanum nigrum.

The roots are added to hot milk to help a woman having uterine pains after childbirth.
