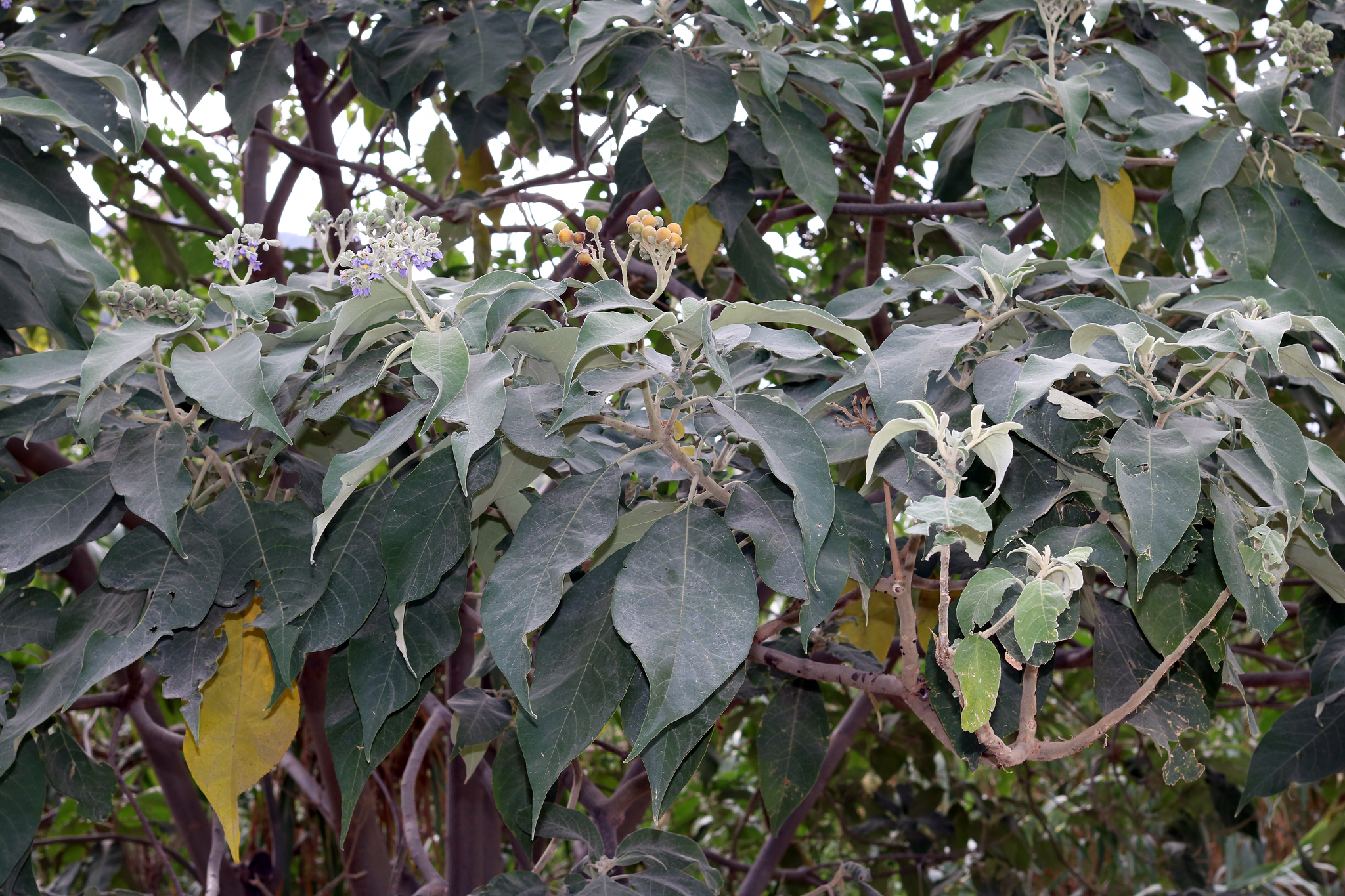

Scientific classification
- Kingdom: Plantae
- Clade: Tracheophytes
- Clade: Angiosperms
- Clade: Eudicots
- Clade: Asterids
- Order: Solanales
- Family: Solanaceae
- Genus: Solanum
- Species: S. mauritianum

Binomial name
- Solanum mauritianum Scop.

Synonyms
- See text

= Solanum mauritianum =

Species of tree

Solanum mauritianum is a small tree or shrub native to South America, including Northern Argentina, Southern Brazil, Paraguay and Uruguay. Its common names include earleaf nightshade (or "ear-leaved nightshade"), woolly nightshade, flannel weed, bugweed, tobacco weed, tobacco bush, wild tobacco and kerosene plant.

== Description ==
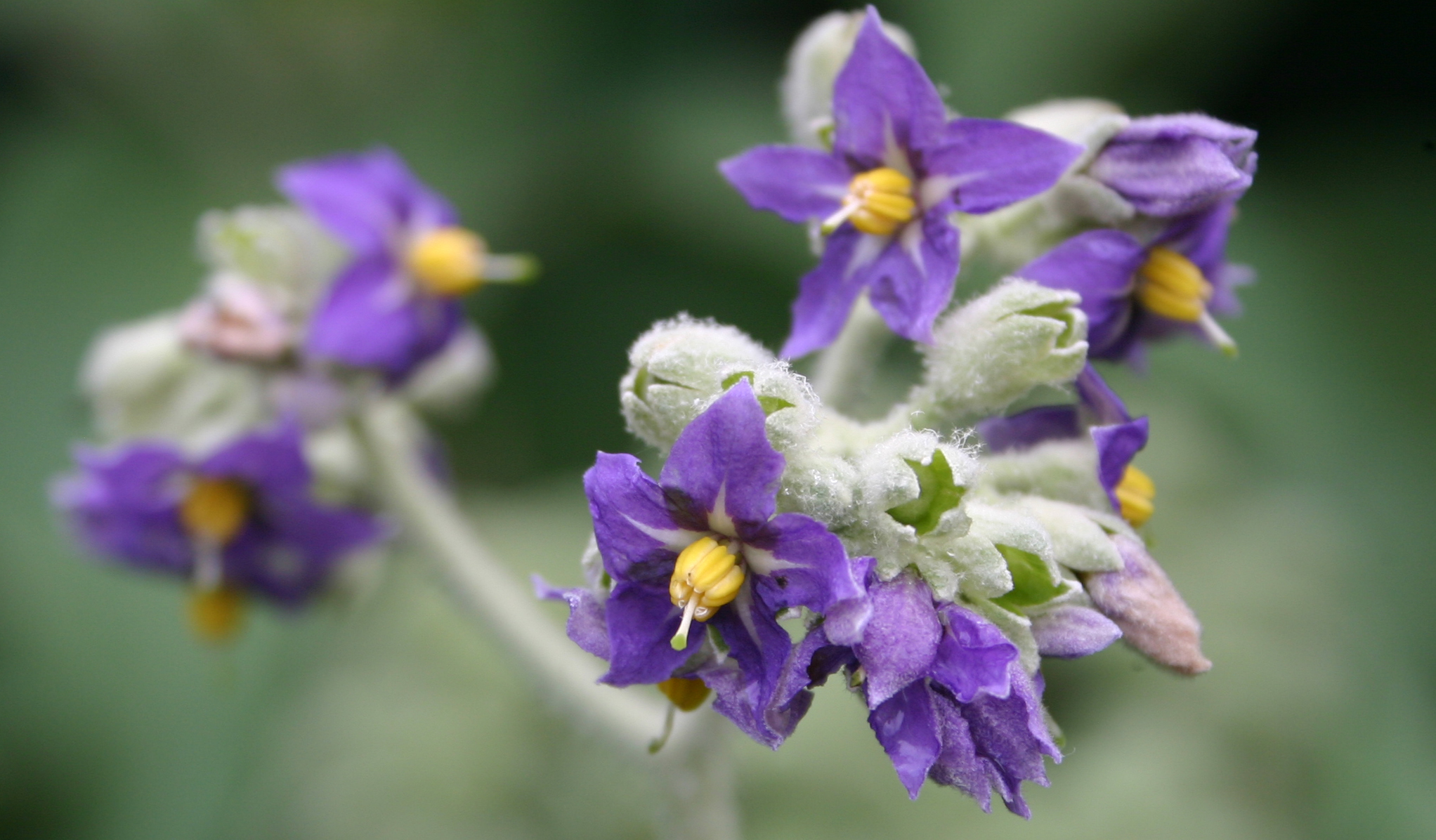
Flowers

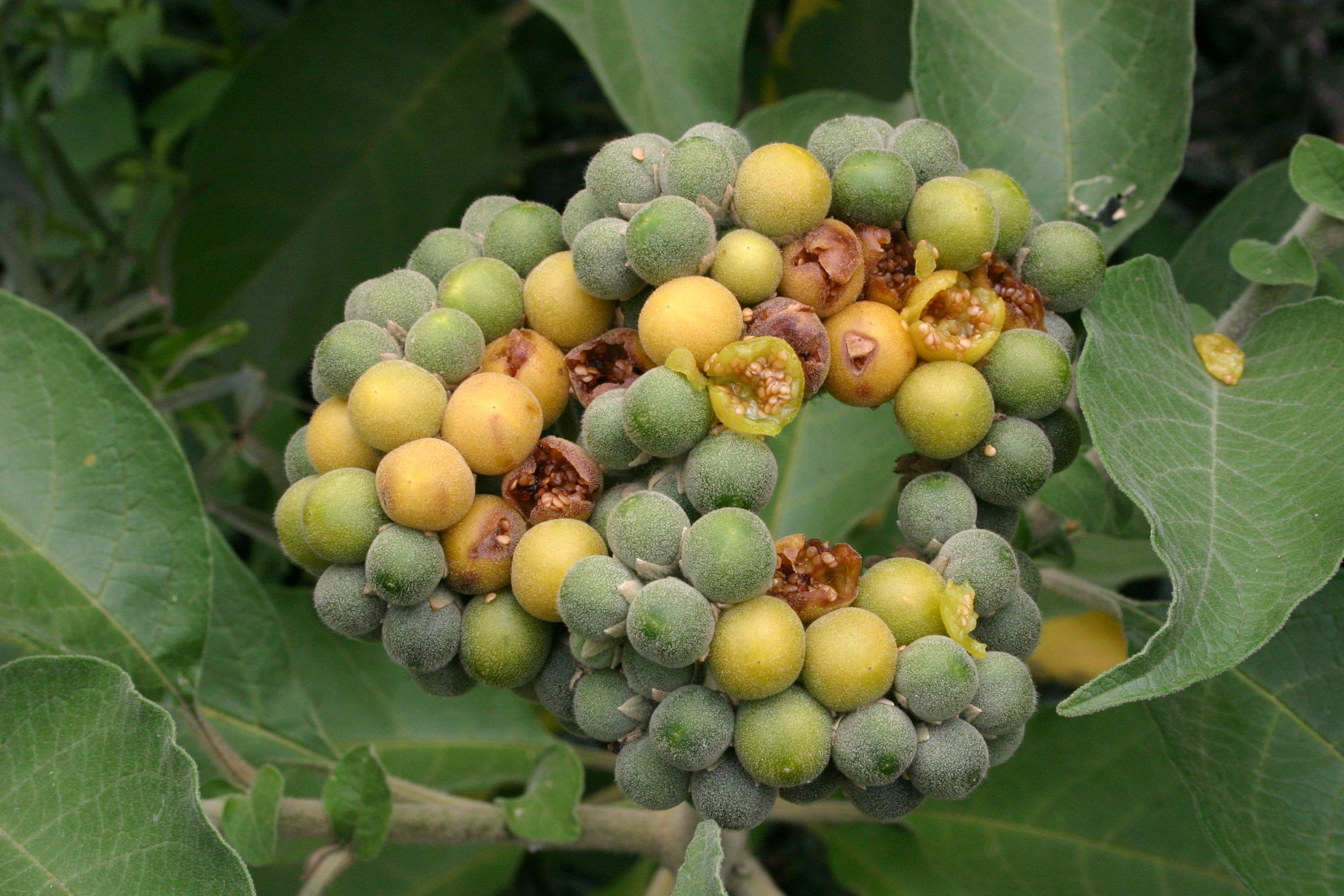
Yellow fruits

The woolly nightshade is a multi-branched shrub or small tree between 2 and 4 meters high (but can grow up to 10 m (33 ft) tall in the right conditions). The plant has a strong odor and a life span of up to thirty years.

The simple, entire, ovate-elliptical large leaves are up to 40 centimeters long, 30 centimeters wide and are grey-green in color. The tip of the leaf is pointed, the base is wedge-shaped. They sit on 3 to 9 centimeters long petioles. They are dense, tomentose with hairy yellowish, long-stemmed, star-shaped trichomes.

=== Inflorescence ===
The slightly scented inflorescences are cymes of purple single flowers with a yellow center and sit on 15 centimeter long inflorescence axes. The sepals are fused into a 2 to 3 millimeter long calyx tube with 1 to 2 millimeter long lobes. The crown is star-shaped and measures between 1.5 and 2.5 centimeters. The five stamens sit on 1 millimeter long filaments. The anthers are egg-shaped and 2 to 3.5 millimeters long. The plant can flower year round but fruiting occurs in late spring to early summer.

After flowering, spherical yellow berries up to 2 cm in size with numerous, flattened seeds 1.5 to 2 millimeters long form.

== As invasive species ==
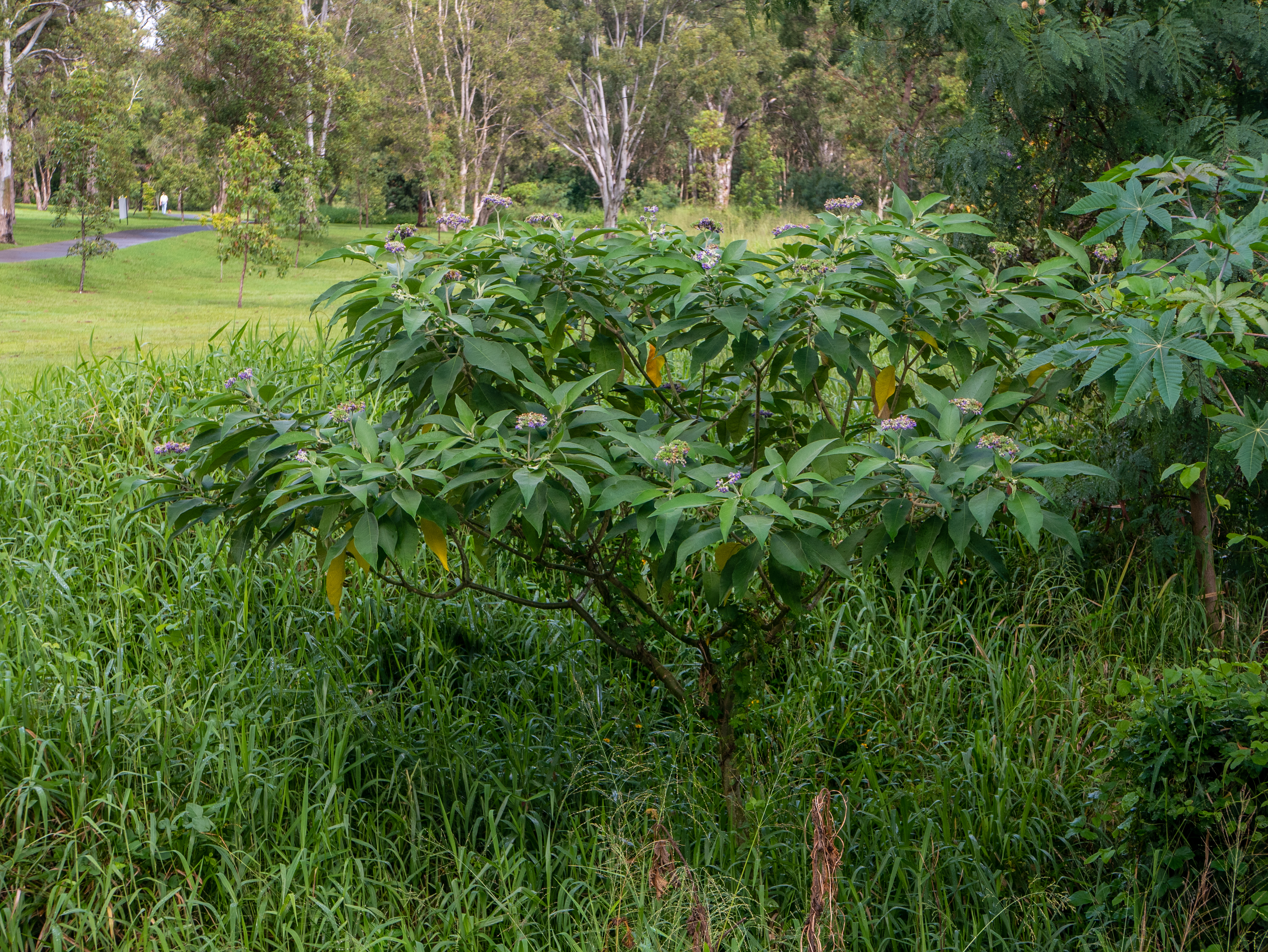
Naturalisation in Australia

Woolly nightshade has become a widespread invasive weed in the Azores Islands, Cook Islands, Fiji, Hawai‘i, Java, New Caledonia, Norfolk Island, Madeira Island, Solomon Islands, Tonga, Réunion Island, Mauritius, Madagascar, Australia, New Zealand, India, Sri Lanka, Nepal, Vietnam, Philippines, continental Portugal, the US states of California and Florida and several sub-Saharan African countries.

It arrived in New Zealand in 1880, and is now well established and naturalized from Taupo northward. Because of its ability to affect human health and because of its aggressive and fast-growing character it is illegal in all areas of New Zealand to sell, propagate, or distribute any part of the plant, under the National Pest Plant Accord. It is poisonous and handling the plants can cause irritation and nausea. The dust-like fine hairs from the plant can cause irritation to the throat, nose, eyes and skin.

This plant has also become naturalized in Australia, particularly on the east coast and in desert ranges (South Australia). In Australia this plant is known colloquially as "tobacco bush weed", although Australia possesses many species of Nicotiana, which are more correctly known as wild tobaccos. It is tolerant of many soil types and quickly becomes established around plantations, forest margins, scrub and open land.

In South Africa, biological control is being used in an attempt to manage Solanum mauritianum – the flowerbud weevil Anthonomus santacruzi is being used as a control agent. S. mauritianum is a favoured food plant of the African olive pigeon (Columba arquatrix), the Cape bulbul, the black-collared barbet, the red-eyed dove and red-whiskered bulbul. In New Zealand biological control with woolly nightshade lace bug (Gargaphia decoris) has been attempted since 2010.

== Toxicity ==
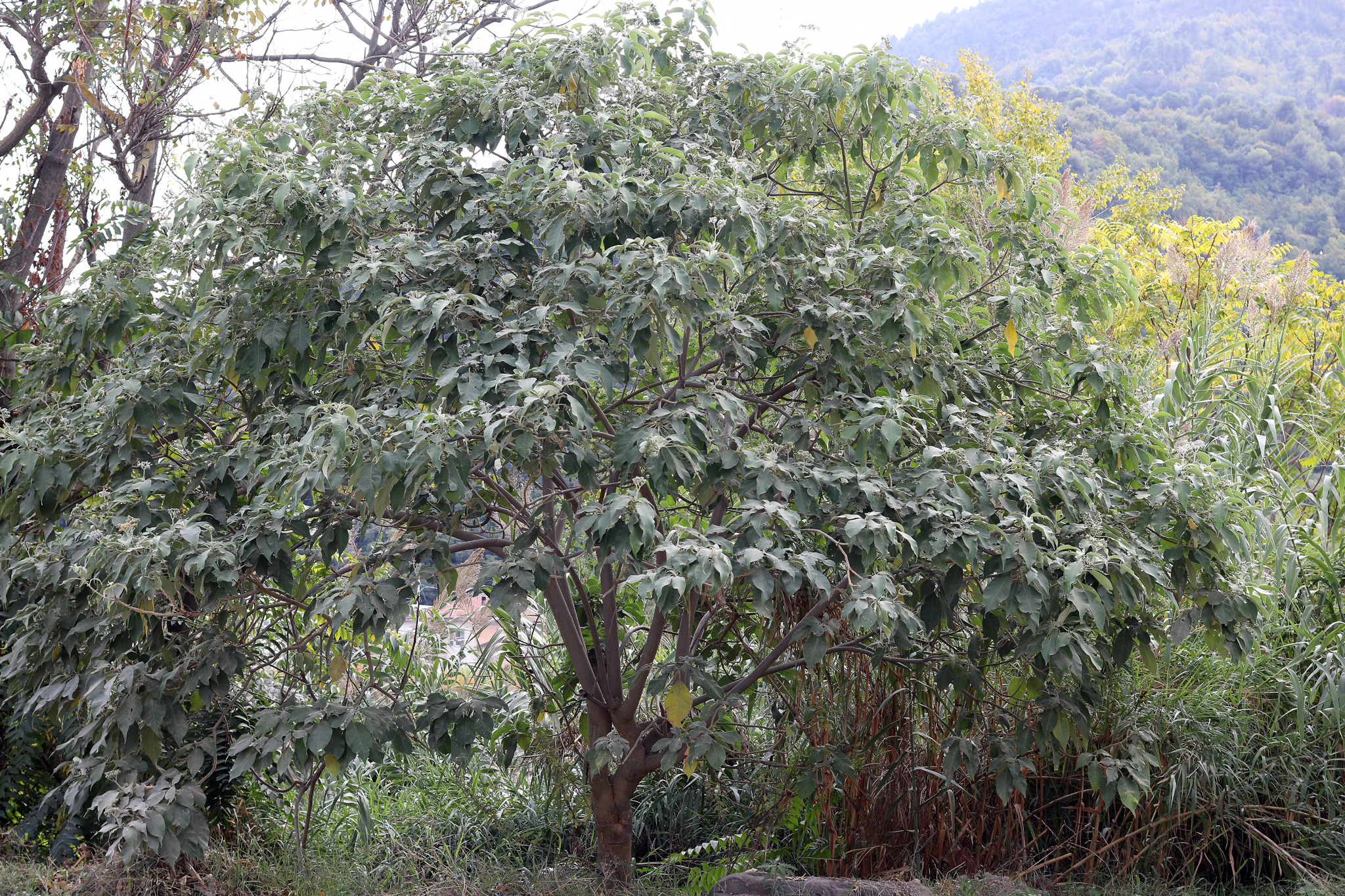
Large, mature tree

It is alleged that all parts of the Solanum mauritianum plant are poisonous to humans, especially the unripe berries, and furthermore that human fatalities have resulted from the consumption of the berries, and cases of fatal poisoning in pigs and illness in cattle have been reported in Queensland.

However, mountain possums appear to eat it without ill effect, and stripping of bark, leaves, and terminal shoots has destroyed pure stands of S.mauritianum. Watt & Brandwijk state that horses, domestic chickens and all birds eat the fruit with impunity, and further state that no records of poisoning in children exist, casting doubt on contrary published accounts.

The main toxic compound is the alkaloid, solasodine, with the highest content in the unripe green berry (2–3.5% dry weight). Solauricine, solauricidine, and solasodamine have also been found in Solanum mauritianum.

== Synonyms ==
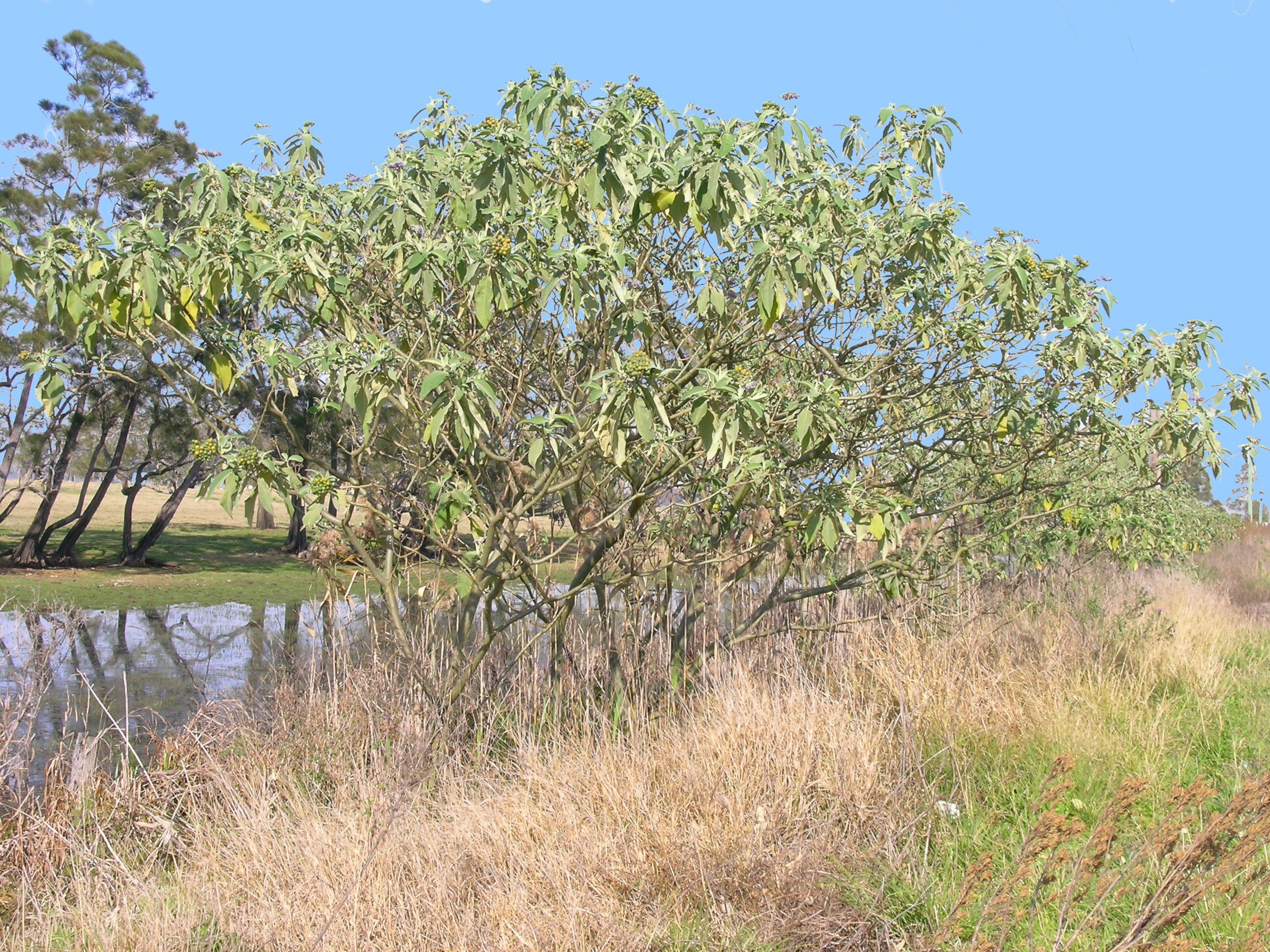
Invading a riverside

The name Solanum mauritianum was applied by Blanco to S. erianthum and by Willdenow based on Roth to S. sisymbriifolium.

In addition, wooly nightshade has a number of synonyms:

- Solanum auriculatum Aiton

S. auriculatum Mart. ex Dunal in DC. is S. granuloso-leprosum.

- Solanum carterianum Rock
- Solanum pulverulentum Salisb. (non L.: preoccupied)

S. pulverulentum Nutt. ex Seem. is S. puberulum. Solanum pulverulentum Pers. is S. cutervanum.

- Solanum tabaccifolium Vell.
- Solanum verbascifolium var. typicum Hassl.
- Solanum verbascifolium var. auriculatum (Aiton) Kuntze
- Solanum verbascifolium var. auriculatum Maiden (non Aiton: preoccupied)

S. verbascifolium L. is S. donianum; S. verbascifolium Banks ex Dunal in DC. is the same as the undeterminable S. stenorchis. Many other Solanum species (S. conglobatum, S. erianthum, S. granuloso-leprosum, S. hazenii, S. riparium, and S. stipulaceum Roem. & Schult.) were once considered varieties of the ill-defined "S. verbascifolium" too.
