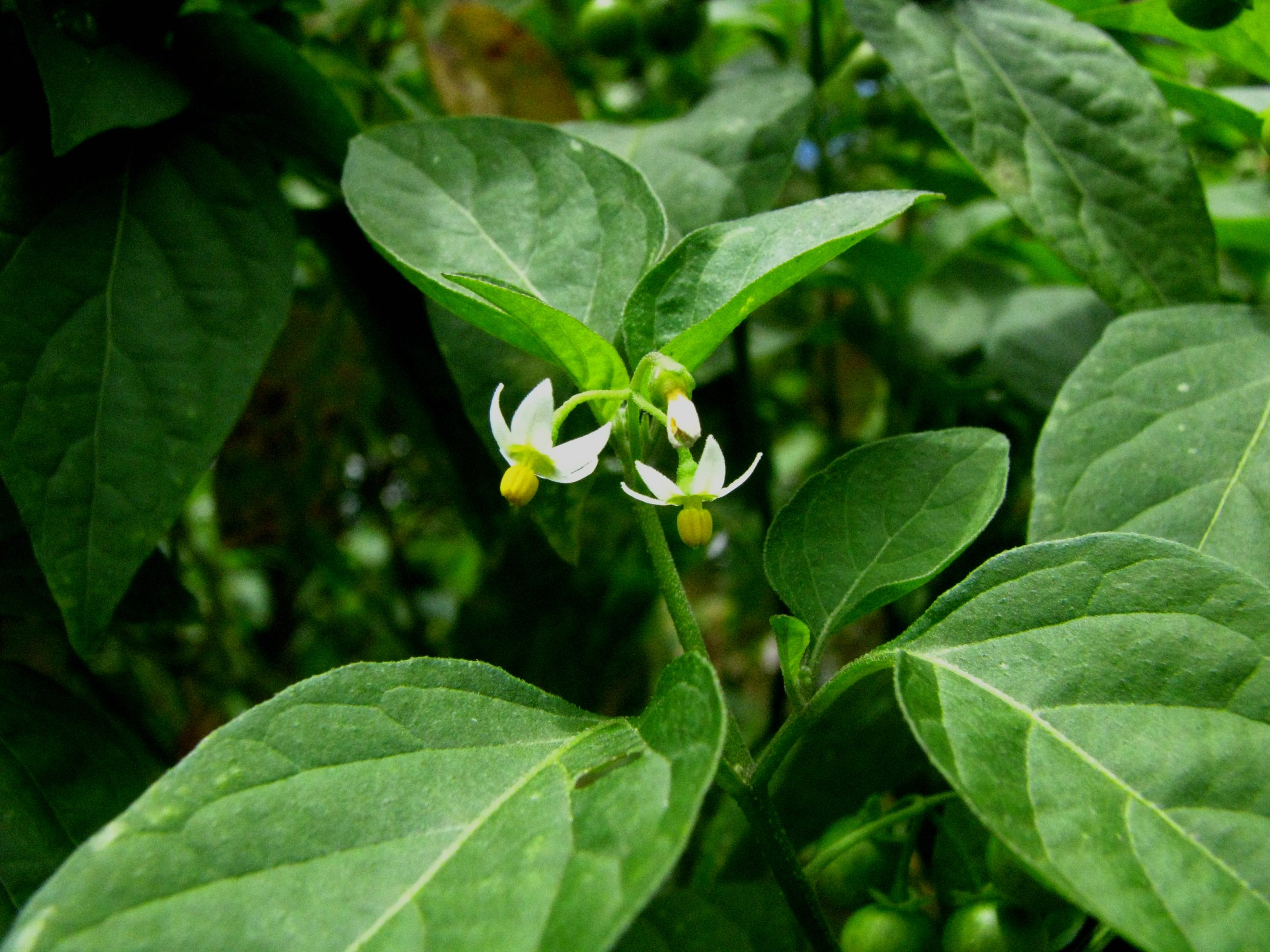

Scientific classification
- Kingdom: Plantae
- Clade: Embryophytes
- Clade: Tracheophytes
- Clade: Spermatophytes
- Clade: Angiosperms
- Clade: Eudicots
- Clade: Asterids
- Order: Solanales
- Family: Solanaceae
- Genus: Solanum
- Species: S. americanum

Binomial name
- Solanum americanum Mill.

Synonyms
- List: Solanum adventitium Polgar; Solanum amarantoides Dunal; Solanum americanum var. nodiflorum (Jacq.) Edmonds; Solanum caribaeum Dunal; Solanum curtipes Bitter; Solanum depilatum Bitter; Solanum ganchouenense H. Lév.; Solanum gollmeri Bitter; Solanum humile Lam.; Solanum imerinense Bitter; Solanum inconspicuum Bitter; Solanum indecorum Rich.; Solanum inops Dunal; Solanum minutibaccatum Bitter; Solanum minutibaccatum var. curtipedunculatum Bitter; Solanum nigrum L.; Solanum nigrum var. americanum (Mill.) O.E. Schulz; Solanum nigrum var. atriplicifolium G. Mey.; Solanum nigrum var. minor Hook. f.; Solanum nigrum var. nodiflorum (Jacq.) A. Gray; Solanum nigrum var. pauciflorum Liou; Solanum nigrum var. virginicum L.; Solanum nodiflorum Jacq.; Solanum nodiflorum var. acuminatum Dunal; Solanum nodiflorum var. macrophyllum Dunal; Solanum nodiflorum var. petiolastrum Dunal; Solanum nodiflorum var. puberulum Dunal; Solanum nodiflorum var. sapucayense Chodat; Solanum oleraceum Dunal; Solanum parviflorum Badarò; Solanum photeinocarpum Nakam. & Odash.; Solanum pterocaulon Dunal; Solanum purpuratum Bitter; Solanum quadrangulare Thunb. ex L. f.; Solanum sciaphilum Bitter; Solanum tenellum Bitter; Solanum triangulare Lam.

= Solanum americanum =

Species of flowering plant in the nightshade family

Solanum americanum, commonly known as American black nightshade, small-flowered nightshade or glossy nightshade, is a herbaceous flowering plant.

== Description ==
Solanum americanum grows up to 1–1.5 metres (39–59 in) tall and is an annual or short-lived perennial. The leaves are alternate on the branch, and vary greatly in size, up to 10 centimetres (4 in) long and 7 cm (3 in) broad, with a 4 cm (1 1/2 in) petiole and a coarsely wavy or toothed margin. The flowers are about 1 cm diameter, white or occasionally light purple, with yellow stamens. The fruit is a shiny black berry 5–10 millimetres (1/4–3/8 in) diameter, containing numerous small seeds.

== Taxonomy ==
Solanum americanum is one of the most widespread and morphologically variable species belonging to the section Solanum. It can be confused with other black nightshade species in the Solanum nigrum complex.

Solanum americanum is a variable taxon. It is considered by some botanists to be more than one species, and others recognise subspecies. Some botanists have suggested that S. americanum may be conspecific with the European nightshade, S. nigrum.

Solanum ptychanthum (eastern black nightshade) has historically been distinguished from S. americanum by differences in its berries and the underside of seedling leaves. However, more recent taxonomies treat them as a single species because of the wide variation in S. americanum.

== Distribution and habitat ==
It has a wide but uncertain native range. The certain native range encompasses the tropics and subtropics of the Americas, Melanesia, New Guinea, and Australia. The plant is widely naturalised around the tropical Pacific and Indian Oceans, including Hawaiʻi, Indochina, Madagascar and Africa, possibly via anthropogenic introduction in these locales.

== Toxicity ==
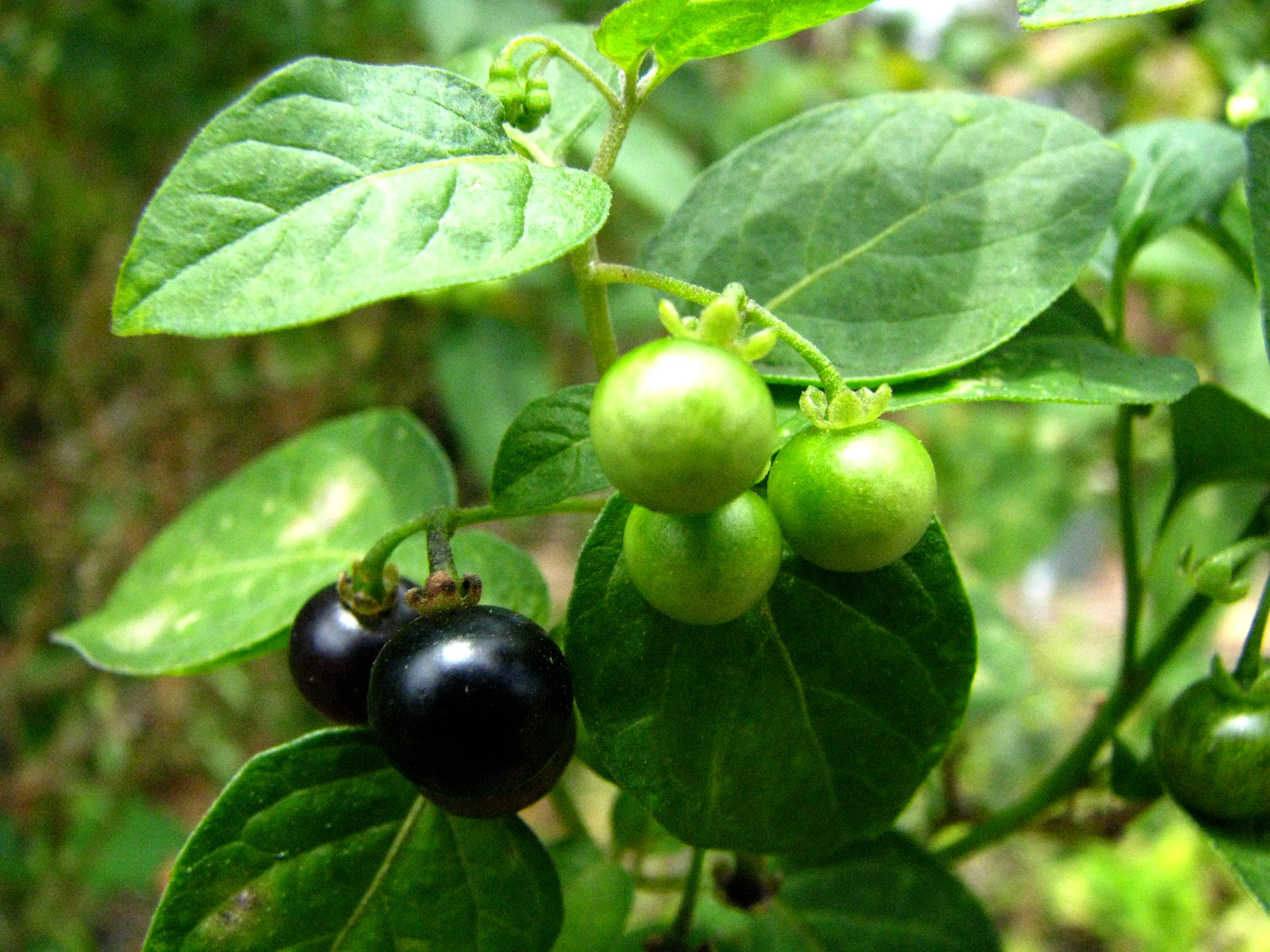
S. americanum berries

Research indicates the presence of toxic glycoalkaloids, with authorities warning to be careful regarding the use of S. americanum as herbal medicine or food. The green fruit is particularly poisonous and eating unripe berries has caused the death of children. Ripe berries and foliage may also cause poisoning, though the toxicity seems to diminish somewhat with ripening. This is due to high levels of the glycoalkaloids, solanine and solamargine. Other toxins present in the plant include chaconine, solasonine, solanigrine, gitogenin and traces of saponins, as well as the tropane alkaloids scopolamine and hyoscyamine (an isomer of atropine).

Significant amounts of solasodine (0.65%) have been found in the green berries. The ripe fruit also contains 0.3–0.45% solasonine, and acetylcholine, and has a cholinesterase-inhibiting effect on human plasma. In Transkei, rural people have a high incidence of esophageal cancer thought to be a result of using S. americanum as a food. Livestock can also be poisoned by high nitrate levels in the leaves. Toxicity varies widely depending on the genetic strain and the location conditions, like soil and rainfall. One field guide of poisonous plants advises, "unless you are certain that the berries are from an edible strain, leave them alone."

== Uses ==
=== Culinary ===
Despite the toxic compounds that they contain, cooked greens and ripe berries of S. americanum are eaten throughout their range.

The ripe fruit is cooked into jams and preserves, or eaten raw. In Africa, South America, New Guinea and Oceania the young green shoots of S. americanum are cooked and eaten as greens, after boiling in water. The cooking water used for boiling the leaves is discarded as it contains the soluble alkaloids. In Kenya, Cameroon and Papua New Guinea the leaves are sold as a leaf vegetable in the markets. The leaves are used in a West Indian stew, and it is known as branched calaloo. In Mauritius it is cultivated and eaten as a pot-herb and used in bouillon. Experts warn that care should be taken since numerous toxins are reported with levels varying with local conditions and varieties.

=== Medicine ===
It is used as a medicine in Cameroon, Kenya, Hawaiʻi, Panama, Sierra Leone, Tanzania and Pakistan. In China a tea from the whole plant is used to treat cancer of the cervix. It is used as folk medicine for a wide range of conditions, being applied topically and internally.

== See also ==
- Sobemovirus
