= Solamargine =

Names
- IUPAC name (22R,25R)-Spirosol-5-en-3β-yl α-L-rhamnopyranosyl-(1→2)-[α-L-rhamnopyranosyl-(1→4)]-β-D-glucopyranoside
- Systematic IUPAC name (2S,2′S,3R,3′R,4R,4′R,5R,5′R,6S,6′S)-2,2′-{[(2R,3S,4S,5R,6R)-4-Hydroxy-2-(hydroxymethyl)-6-{[(2S,2′R,4aR,4bS,5′R,6aS,6bR,7S,9aS,10aS,10bS)-4a,5′,6a,7-tetramethyl-1,2,3,4,4a,4b,5,6,6a,6b,7,9a,10,10a,10b,11-hexadecahydrospiro[naptho[2′,1′:4,5]indeno[2,1-b]furan-8,2′-piperidin]-2-yl]oxy}oxane-3,5-diyl]bis(oxy)}bis(6-methyloxane-3,4,5-triol)
- Other names Solamargin; δ-Solanigrine

Identifiers
CAS Number	20311-51-7
3D model (JSmol)	Interactive image
ChEMBL	ChEMBL443114
ChemSpider	66278
PubChem CID	73611
UNII	8KG991E7BN
CompTox Dashboard (EPA)	DTXSID00942456
- InChI: InChI=1S/C45H73NO15/c1-19-9-14-45(46-17-19)20(2)30-28(61-45)16-27-25-8-7-23-15-24(10-12-43(23,5)26(25)11-13-44(27,30)6)57-42-39(60-41-36(53)34(51)32(49)22(4)56-41)37(54)38(29(18-47)58-42)59-40-35(52)33(50)31(48)21(3)55-40/h7,19-22,24-42,46-54H,8-18H2,1-6H3/t19-,20+,21+,22+,24+,25-,26+,27+,28+,29-,30+,31+,32+,33-,34-,35-,36-,37+,38-,39-,40+,41+,42-,43+,44+,45-/m1/s1 Key: MBWUSSKCCUMJHO-ZGXDEBHDSA-N; InChI=1/C45H73NO15/c1-19-9-14-45(46-17-19)20(2)30-28(61-45)16-27-25-8-7-23-15-24(10-12-43(23,5)26(25)11-13-44(27,30)6)57-42-39(60-41-36(53)34(51)32(49)22(4)56-41)37(54)38(29(18-47)58-42)59-40-35(52)33(50)31(48)21(3)55-40/h7,19-22,24-42,46-54H,8-18H2,1-6H3/t19-,20+,21+,22+,24+,25-,26+,27+,28+,29-,30+,31+,32+,33-,34-,35-,36-,37+,38-,39-,40+,41+,42-,43+,44+,45-/m1/s1 Key: MBWUSSKCCUMJHO-ZGXDEBHDBL
- SMILES: O([C@H]8[C@H](O[C@@H]5C/C4=C/C[C@H]3[C@@H]6C[C@@H]2O[C@@]1(NC[C@H](C)CC1)[C@@H](C)[C@@H]2[C@@]6(C)CC[C@@H]3[C@@]4(C)CC5)O[C@H](CO)[C@@H](O[C@@H]7O[C@@H](C)[C@H](O)[C@@H](O)[C@H]7O)[C@@H]8O)[C@@H]9O[C@H]([C@H](O)[C@@H](O)[C@H]9O)C

Properties
Chemical formula	C_{45}H_{73}NO_{15}
Molar mass	868.071 g·mol^{−1}
- Except where otherwise noted, data are given for materials in their standard state (at 25 °C [77 °F], 100 kPa). verify (what is ?) Infobox references

Solamargine is a cytotoxic chemical compound that occurs in plants of the family Solanaceae, such as potatoes, tomatoes, and eggplants. It has been also isolated from Solanum nigrum fungal endophyte Aspergillus flavus. It is a glycoalkaloid derived from the steroidal alkaloid solasodine.

Solamargine was one component of the unsuccessful experimental cancer drug candidate Coramsine.

== See also ==
- Solanum americanum
