= Solasonine =

Identifiers
| CAS Number | 19121-58-5 |
| 3D model (JSmol) | Interactive image |
| ChEBI | CHEBI:9191 |
| ChEMBL | ChEMBL438956 |
| ChemSpider | 106525 |
| DrugBank | DB17103 |
| ECHA InfoCard | 100.038.917 |
| EC Number | 242-826-6 |
| KEGG | C10824 |
| PubChem CID | 119247 |
| UNII | TR60638HXL |
| CompTox Dashboard (EPA) | DTXSID801028790 |
- InChI: InChI=1S/C45H73NO16/c1-19-8-13-45(46-16-19)20(2)30-27(62-45)15-26-24-7-6-22-14-23(9-11-43(22,4)25(24)10-12-44(26,30)5)57-42-39(61-40-36(54)34(52)31(49)21(3)56-40)38(33(51)29(18-48)59-42)60-41-37(55)35(53)32(50)28(17-47)58-41/h6,19-21,23-42,46-55H,7-18H2,1-5H3/t19-,20+,21+,23+,24-,25+,26+,27+,28-,29-,30+,31+,32-,33+,34-,35+,36-,37-,38+,39-,40+,41+,42-,43+,44+,45-/m1/s1; Key: QCTMYNGDIBTNSK-XEAAVONHSA-N
- SMILES: C[C@@H]1CC[C@@]2(NC1)O[C@H]3C[C@H]4[C@@H]5CC=C6C[C@H](CC[C@]6(C)[C@H]5CC[C@]4(C)[C@H]3[C@@H]2C)O[C@@H]7O[C@H](CO)[C@H](O)[C@H](O[C@@H]8O[C@H](CO)[C@@H](O)[C@H](O)[C@H]8O)[C@H]7O[C@@H]9O[C@@H](C)[C@H](O)[C@@H](O)[C@H]9O

Properties
| Chemical formula | C_{45}H_{73}NO_{16} |
| Molar mass | 884.070 g·mol^{−1} |

Hazards
- GHS labelling
| Pictograms | (GHS07: Exclamation mark) |
| Signal word | Warning |
| Hazard statements | H302 |
| Precautionary statements | P264, P270, P301+P317, P330, P501 |
- Except where otherwise noted, data are given for materials in their standard state (at 25 °C [77 °F], 100 kPa). Infobox references

Solasonine is a glycoalkaloid that is found in Solanum plants of the family Solanaceae. Solasonine is a poisonous chemical compound when used at high levels. It is a glycoside of solasodine. Glycoalkaloids such as solasonine have various applications including pharmacology, cancer treatments and even a role as a pesticide.

High levels of glycoalkaloids are toxic to humans due to their ability to disrupt cell-membrane function. There is a loss of membrane integrity which puts the cell at risk for apoptosis (cell death) due to the ability of any chemical coming into contact with the cell.

Solasonine was one component of the unsuccessful experimental cancer drug candidate Coramsine.

== Anticancer Potential ==
Solasonine is one of the main components in the plant Solanum nigrum Linn.. The plant has been used in traditional Chinese medicine due to its anti-inflammatory and anti-viral properties. Recent studies highlight the effects of solasonine and its anticancer potential by the suppression of tumor growth, inducing apoptosis, and activating ferroptosis.

Solasonine enhances anticancer potential by inducing apoptosis, or programmed cell death, through the regulation of key pathways, such as the mitochondrial membrane permeability. Ferroptosis, a process that promotes cancer cell death, can be activated with solasonine by increasing and catalyzing reactive oxygen species (ROS) production.

== Side Effects ==
Although, solasonine has anti-infection properties it has many adverse side effects as a steroidal glycoalkaloid. These side effects include low blood pressure, a decrease in respiratory activity, rapid heart beat etc. These side effects are the direct result of the cytotoxic properties of solasonine (at high levels) that lead to disrupted cell membranes. Not only do high doses of solasonine disrupt cellular DNA synthesis, but they also suggest the presence of genotoxic and mutagenic effects. Toxic symptoms such as headache, gastrointestinal irritation, vomiting, diarrhea, etc. can be the result of an overdose on Solanum nigrum Linn..

== See also ==
- Solauricidine
