= Solasodine =

Names
- IUPAC name (22R,25R)-Spirosol-5α-en-3β-ol
- Systematic IUPAC name (2S,2′R,4aR,4bS,5′R,6aS,6bR,7S,9aS,10aS,10bS)-4a,5′,6a,7-Tetramethyl-1,2,3,4,4a,4b,5,6,6a,6b,7,9a,10,10a,10b,11-hexadecahydrospiro[naptho[2′,1′:4,5]indeno[2,1-b]furan-8,2′-piperidin]-2-ol
- Other names Purapuridine; Solancarpidine; Solanearpidine; Solanidine-S

Identifiers
CAS Number	126-17-0
3D model (JSmol)	Interactive image
ChEBI	CHEBI:9190
ChEMBL	ChEMBL514596
ChemSpider	391288
ECHA InfoCard	100.004.341
EC Number	204-774-2
KEGG	C10822
PubChem CID	442985
UNII	L40Y453Y96
CompTox Dashboard (EPA)	DTXSID101030558
- InChI: InChI=1S/C27H43NO2/c1-16-7-12-27(28-15-16)17(2)24-23(30-27)14-22-20-6-5-18-13-19(29)8-10-25(18,3)21(20)9-11-26(22,24)4/h5,16-17,19-24,28-29H,6-15H2,1-4H3/t16-,17+,19+,20-,21+,22+,23+,24+,25+,26+,27-/m1/s1 Key: KWVISVAMQJWJSZ-VKROHFNGSA-N
- SMILES: O[C@@H]6C/C5=C/C[C@@H]1[C@H](CC[C@]3([C@H]1C[C@@H]4O[C@@]2(NC[C@H](C)CC2)[C@H]([C@H]34)C)C)[C@@]5(C)CC6

Properties
Chemical formula	C_{27}H_{43}NO_{2}
Molar mass	413.646 g·mol^{−1}
- Except where otherwise noted, data are given for materials in their standard state (at 25 °C [77 °F], 100 kPa). verify (what is ?) Infobox references

Solasodine is a poisonous alkaloid chemical compound that occurs in plants of the family Solanaceae such as potatoes and tomatoes. Solasonine and solamargine are glycoalkaloid derivatives of solasodine. Solasodine is teratogenic to hamster fetuses in a dose of 1200 to 1600 mg/kg. A 2013 literature survey found that various studies have indicated that solasodine may have diuretic, anticancer, antifungal, cardiotonic, antispermatogenetic, antiandrogenic, immunomodulatory, antipyretic and/or various other effects on central nervous system.

== Uses ==
It is commercially used as a precursor for the production of complex steroidal compounds such as contraceptive pills, via a 16-DPA intermediate.

== See also ==
- Solanum mauritianum
