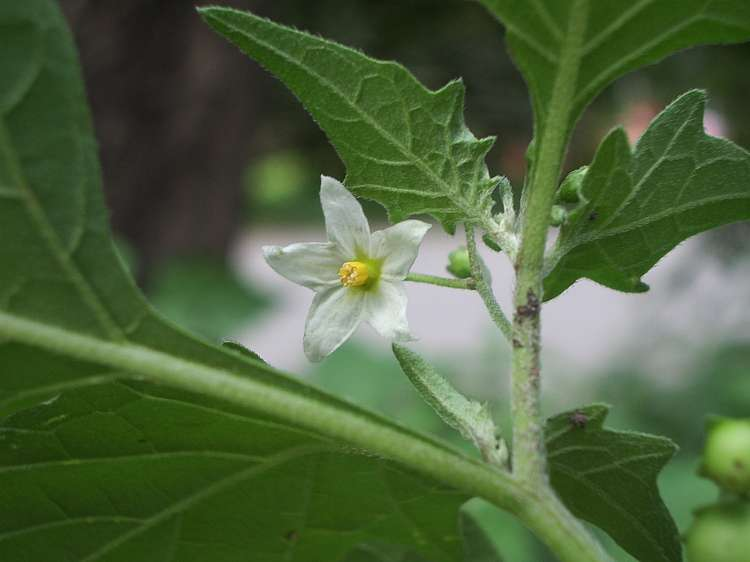

Scientific classification
- Kingdom: Plantae
- Clade: Tracheophytes
- Clade: Angiosperms
- Clade: Eudicots
- Clade: Asterids
- Order: Solanales
- Family: Solanaceae
- Genus: Solanum
- Species: S. nigrum

Binomial name
- Solanum nigrum L.

Subspecies
- S. nigrum subsp. nigrum S. nigrum subsp. schultesii S. nigrum subsp. vulgare

= Solanum nigrum =

Black nightshade

Species of flowering plant in the nightshade family

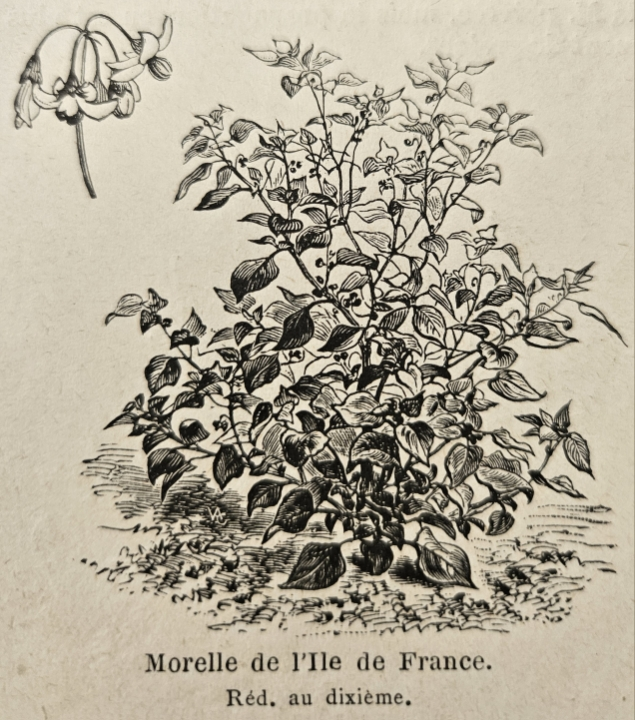
Illustration "Morelle de l'île de France" in Vilmorin 1925

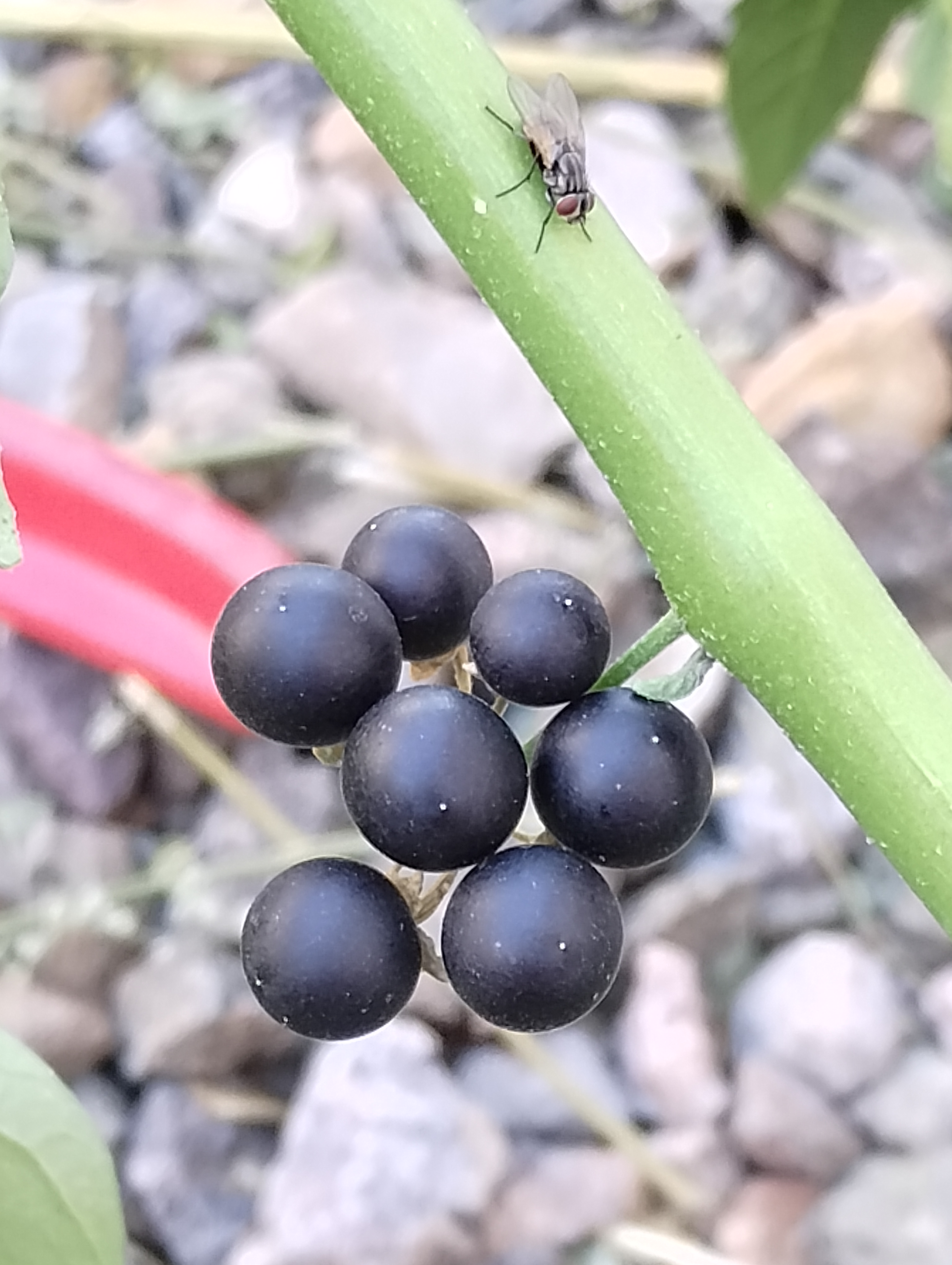
Ripe berries of S. nigrum

Solanum nigrum, the European black nightshade or simply black nightshade or blackberry nightshade, is a species of flowering plant in the family Solanaceae, native to Eurasia and introduced in the Americas, Australasia, and South Africa. Ripe berries and cooked leaves of edible strains are used as food in some locales, and plant parts are used as a traditional medicine. Some other species may also be referred to as "black nightshade".

Solanum nigrum has been recorded from deposits of the Paleolithic and Mesolithic era of ancient Britain and it is suggested by the botanist and ecologist Edward Salisbury that it was part of the native flora there before Neolithic agriculture emerged. The plant was known and mentioned by ancient herbalists, including Dioscorides. In 1753, Carl Linnaeus described six varieties of Solanum nigrum in Species Plantarum.

== Description ==
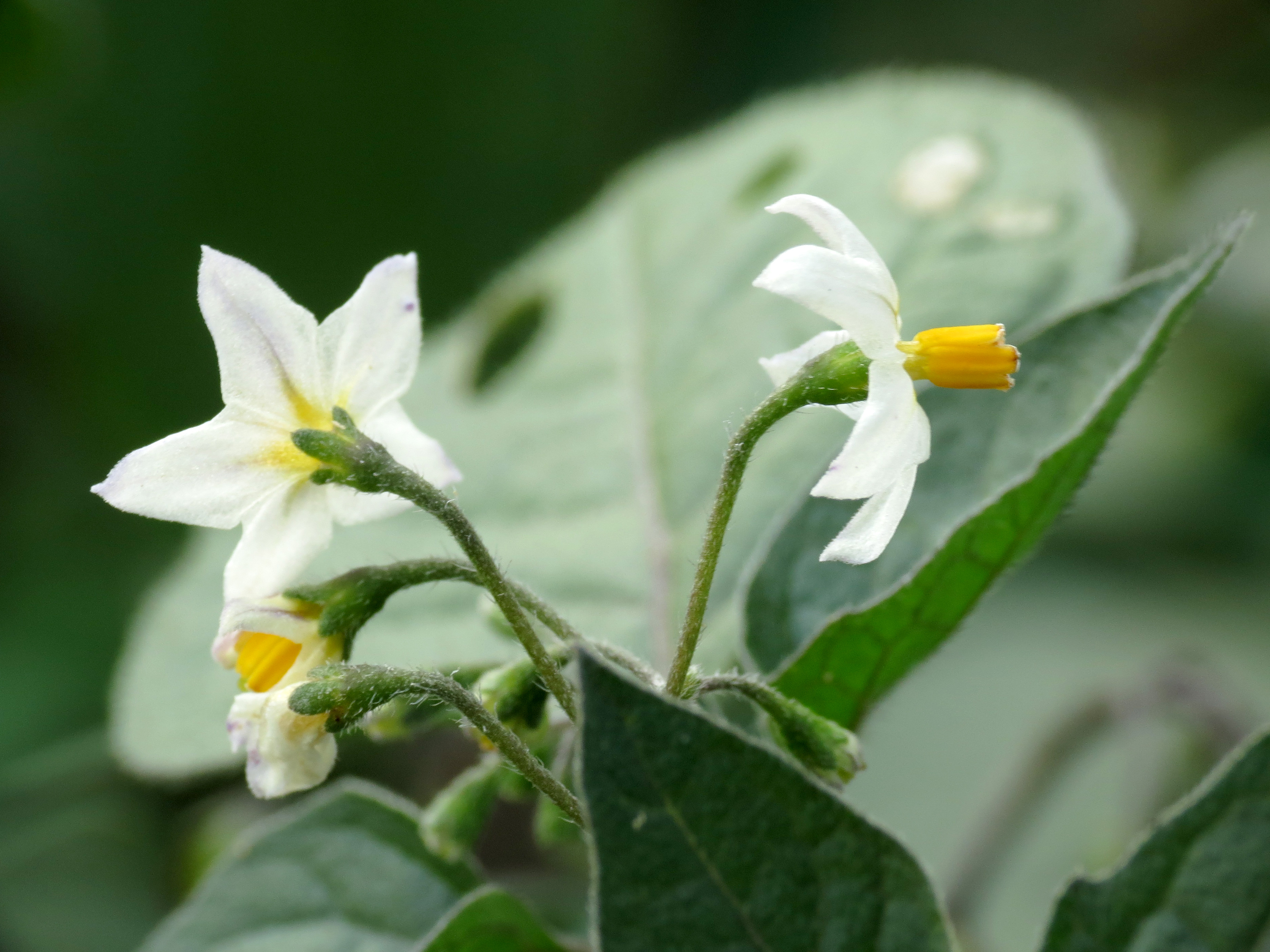
Black nightshade flowers

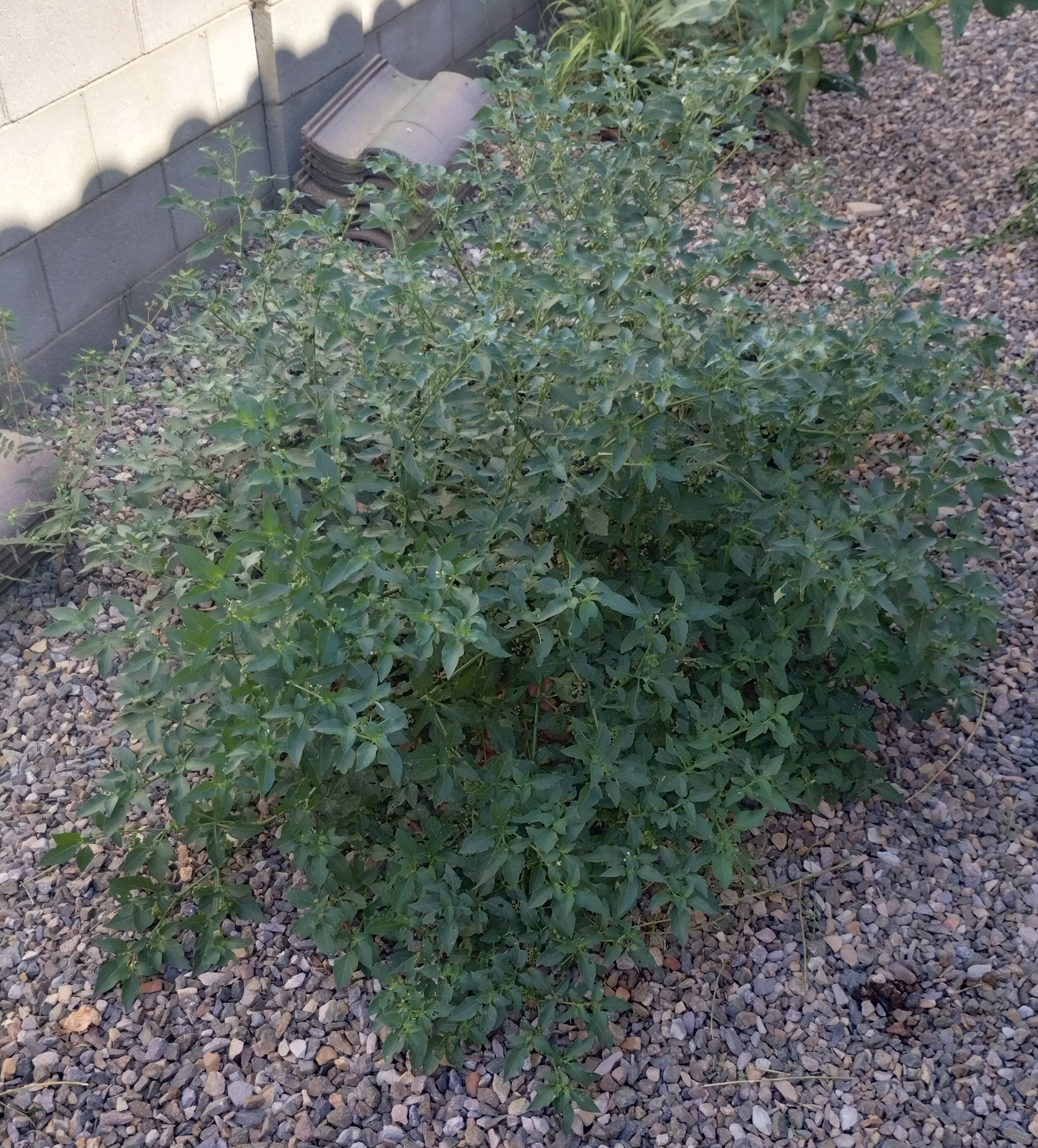
Habit

Black nightshade is a common herb or short-lived perennial shrub, found in many wooded areas, as well as disturbed habitats. It reaches a height of 30 to 120 cm (12 to 47 in), leaves 4.0 to 7.5 cm (1.6 to 3.0 in) long and 2 to 5 cm (1 to 2 in) wide; ovate to heart-shaped, with wavy or large-toothed edges; both surfaces hairy or hairless; petiole 1 to 3 cm (0.5 to 1 in) long with a winged upper portion. The flowers have petals greenish to whitish, recurved when aged and surround prominent bright yellow anthers. The berry is mostly 6 to 8 mm (0.24 to 0.31 in) in diameter, dull black or purple-black. In India, another strain is found with berries that turn red when ripe.

Sometimes S. nigrum is confused for the more toxic deadly nightshade (Atropa belladonna), which is in a different genus within Solanaceae. A comparison of the fruit shows that the black nightshade berries grow in bunches, whereas the deadly nightshade berries grow individually. Another distinction is black nightshade flowers have white petals, whereas deadly nightshade flowers have purple petals.

=== Growth habit ===
The suited soil pH value of black nightshade is between 5.5 and 6.5. Preferring rich organic matter; being well watered and improved verility. However, in the lack of organic matter, poor ventilation (heavy) clay, its roots will be stunted, plant growth is weak and fruiting commodity is therefore poor. It is difficult to grow in high temperatures and high humidity.

== Taxonomy ==
Solanum nigrum is a highly variable species with many varieties and forms described. The recognized subspecies are:

1. S. nigrum L. subsp. nigrum – glabrous to slightly hairy with appressed non-glandular hairs
2. S. nigrum L. subsp. schultesii (Opiz) Wessley – densely hairy with patent, glandular hairs
3. S. nigrum L. subsp. vulgare – found in cooler regions, has a more spreading habit and its leaves might be more wrinkled compared to the typical subspecies.

The Solanum nigrum complex — also known as Solanum L. section Solanum – is the group of black nightshade species characterized by their lack of prickles and stellate hairs, their white flowers, and their green or black fruits arranged in an umbelliform fashion. The Solanum species in this group can be taxonomically confused, more so by intermediate forms and hybridization between the species. Some of the major species within the S. nigrum complex are: S. nigrum, S. americanum, S. douglasii, S. opacum, S. ptychanthum, S. retroflexum, S. sarrachoides, S. scabrum, and S. villosum.

== Toxicity ==
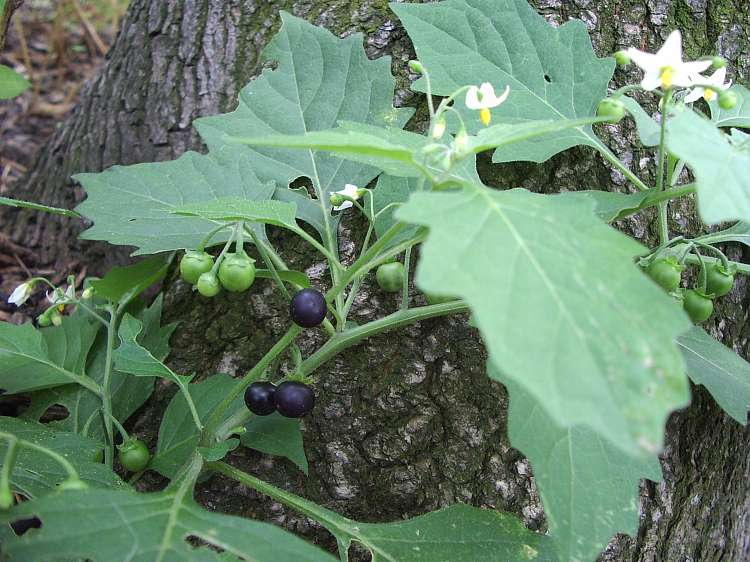
Leaves, flowers and fruit of S. nigrum

Solanine levels in S. nigrum have been tested, and the plant is rarely fatal.

Solanine poisoning symptoms may occur when immature green fruit or mature leaves are ingested raw. There is typically a delay of 6 to 12 hours after ingestion for symptoms to occur. Initial symptoms of toxicity include fever, sweating, vomiting, abdominal pain, diarrhea, confusion, and drowsiness. Death from ingesting large amounts of the plant results from cardiac arrhythmias and respiratory failure. Livestock have also been poisoned from nitrate toxicity by grazing the mature leaves and green berries of S. nigrum. In central Spain, the great bustard (Otis tarda) may act as a seed disperser of European black nightshade (Solanum nigrum). Black nightshade is highly variable, and some advice says to avoid eating the berries unless they are a known edible strain. The toxin levels may also be affected by the plant's growing conditions. The toxins in S. nigrum are most concentrated in the unripe green berries, and immature fruit should be treated as toxic. Most cases of suspected poisoning are due to consumption of leaves or unripe fruit. There are ethnobotanical accounts of S. nigrum young leaves and shoots being boiled as a vegetable with the cooking water being discarded and replaced several times to remove toxins. Solanine is practically insoluble in water and can be destroyed by boiling but not by baking. S. nigrum's leaves may be different from this perspective. Young cooked leaves of Solanum complex sp. are a source of many useful nutrients similar to levels found in spinach. Solanum complex berries have been consumed since ancient times.

== Uses ==
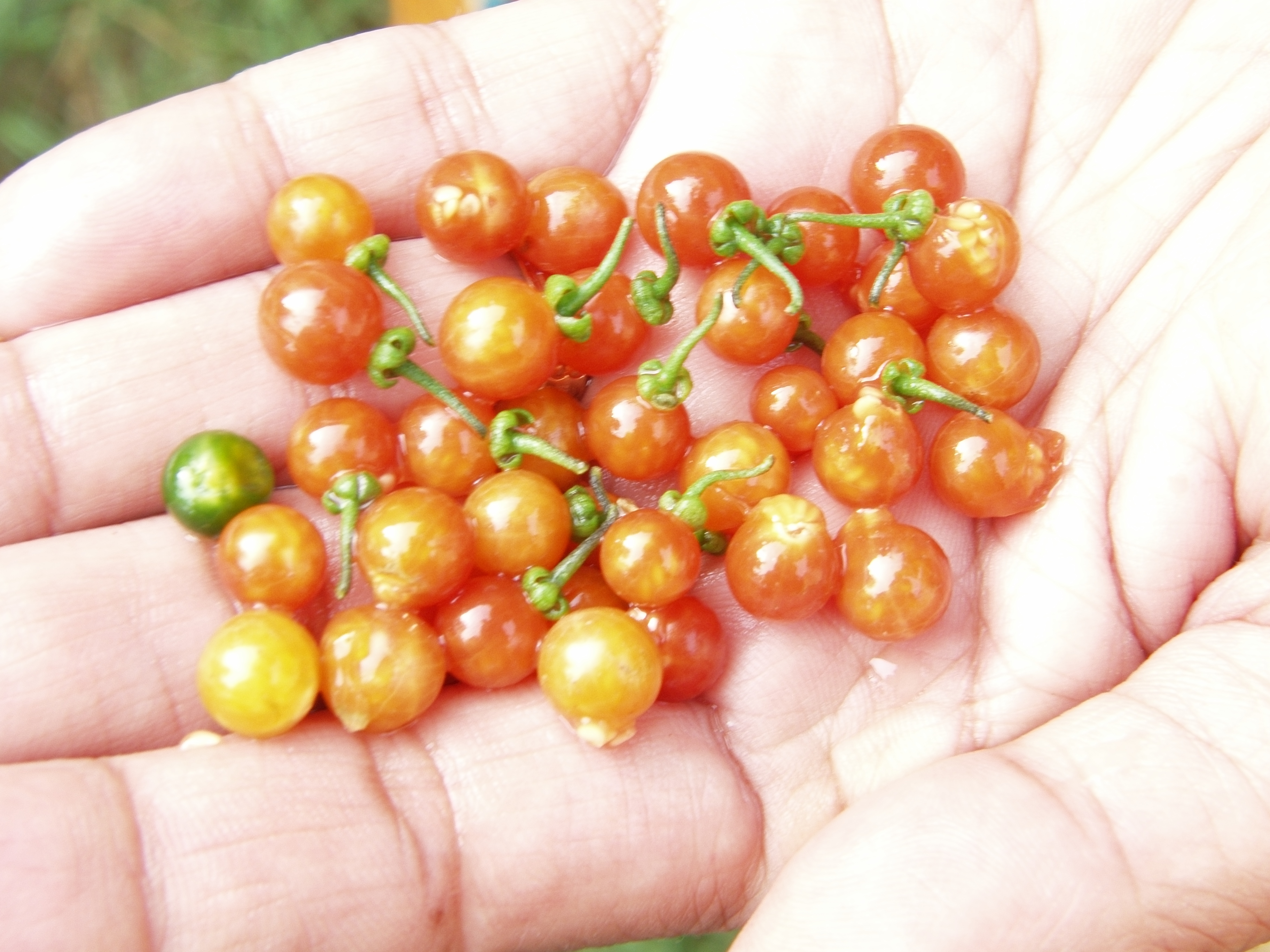
Ripe berries of the "Red Makoy", which is an edible variety of S. nigrum

Some of the uses ascribed to S. nigrum in literature may actually apply to other black nightshade species within the same species complex, and proper species identification is essential for food and medicinal uses (see Taxonomy section).

=== Culinary use ===
S. nigrum has been widely used as a food since early times, and the fruit was recorded as a famine food in 15th-century China. Despite toxicity issues with some forms, the ripe berries and boiled leaves of edible strains are eaten. The thoroughly boiled leaves – although strong and slightly bitter flavours – are used like spinach as horta and in fataya pies and quiches. The ripe black berries are described as sweet and salty, with hints of liquorice and melon.

In Kenya, among the Abagusii, S. nigrum (rinagu – singular; amanagu – plural) is a vegetable delicacy which when blanched and sauteed or boiled to soften and then salted or sauteed and eaten with Ugali (a corn meal dish). In the rest of Kenya, S. nigrum (managu) is eaten in a similar way.

In Tanzania, S. nigrum (mnafu or mnamvu in Kiswahili) is a popular green vegetable. Sautéed with chicken or pork, eaten with Ugali, it is an expensive meal in most restaurants in urban areas. Traditionally, the Iraqw people in northern Tanzania have used S. nigrum (manakw) as vegetable for generations, eaten with special 'ugali' (xwante), stiff porridge made with corn, millet or sorghum flour. An ethnobotanical survey conducted in the mid 1990s on the islands of Zanzibar and Pemba indicated that S. nigrum was referred to as vwevwe in Kiswahili.

In India, the berries are casually grown and eaten, but not cultivated for commercial use. In South India, the leaves and berries are routinely consumed as food after cooking with tamarind, onion, and cumin seeds. The berries are referred to as "fragrant tomato". Although not very popular across much of its growing region, the fruit and dish are common in Tamil Nadu (மணத்தக்காளி in Tamil), Kerala, southern Andhra Pradesh, and southern Karnataka. They are used not only fresh but also dried.

In Ethiopia, the ripe berries are picked and eaten by children. During famines, all affected people would eat berries. In addition, the leaves are collected by women and children, who cook the leaves in salty water and consume them like any other vegetable. Farmers in the Konso Special Woreda report that because S. nigrum matures before the maize is ready for harvesting, it is used as a food source until their crops are ready. The Welayta people in the nearby Wolayita Zone do not weed out S. nigrum that appears in their gardens since they likewise cook and eat the leaves.

In Ghana, they are called kwaansusuaa, and are used in preparing various soups and stews, including the popular palm nut soup commonly eaten with banku or fufu.

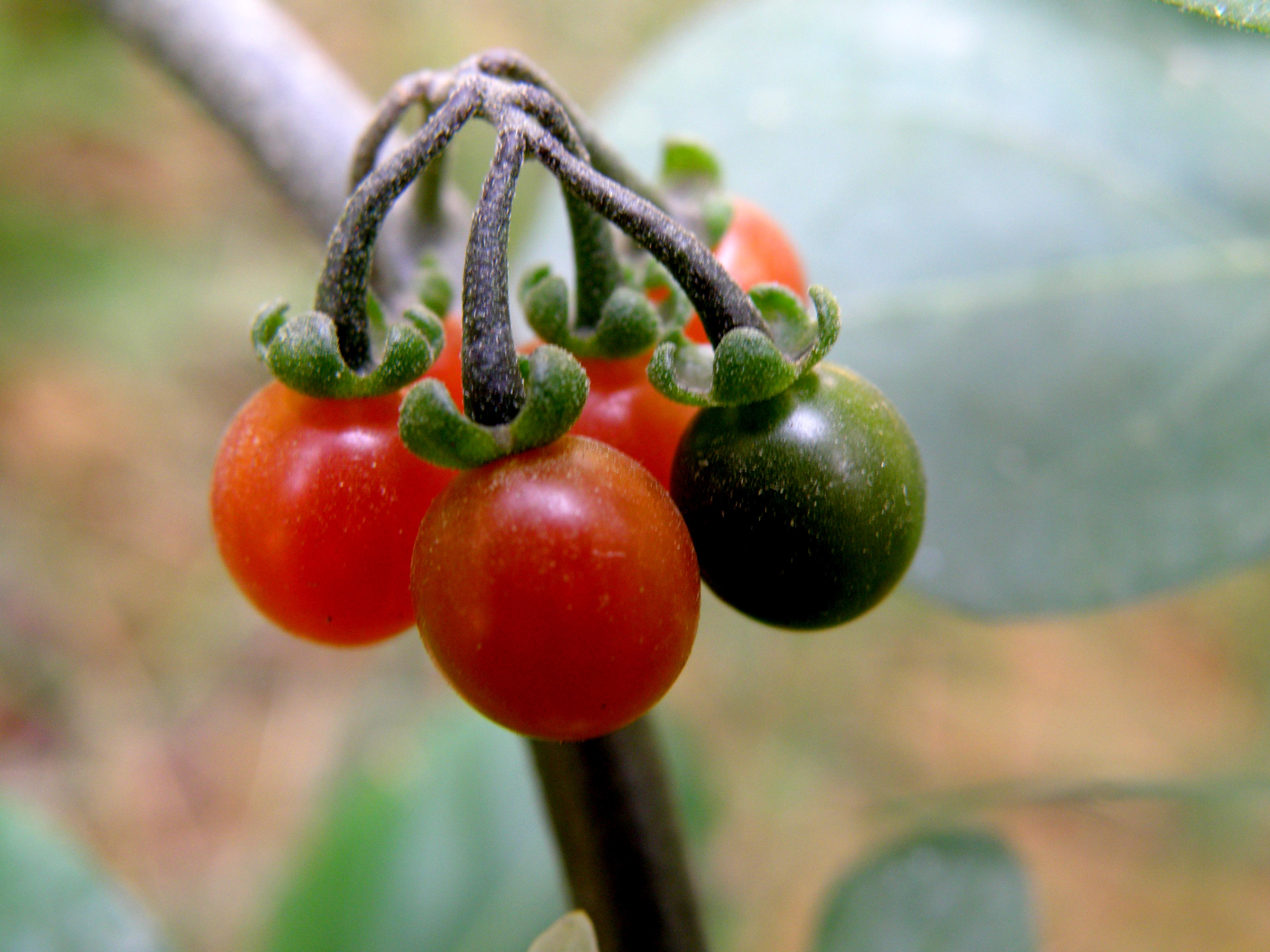
Ripe and unripe S. nigrum berries of the (red-berried) variety that grows in India

In South Africa, the very ripe and hand-selected fruit (nastergal in Afrikaans and umsobo in Zulu) is cooked into a runny purple jam. However, the fruit used in South Africa is more likely to be Solanum retroflexum.

In Greece and Turkey, the leaves are called istifno, and in Crete known as stifno. They are one of the ingredients included in the salad of boiled greens known as horta.

In Indonesia, the young fruits and leaves of cultivated forms are used and are known as ranti (Javanese) or leunca (Sundanese). The fruit and leaves are eaten raw as part of a traditional salad lalapan, or the fruit is cooked (fried) with oncom.

It was imported into Australia in the 1850s as a vegetable during the gold rush, but S. nigrum is now prohibited for trade as a food by the Australia New Zealand Food Standards Code.

During ancient times in Hawaii young shoots, leaves, small white flowers, and small black berries were eaten. The leaves, among other greens, were cooked by rolling hot stones among them in a covered gourd.

=== Medicinal usage ===
The plant has a long history of medicinal usage, dating back to medieval Greece, "... In the fourteenth century, we hear of the plant under the name of Petty Morel being used for canker and with Horehound and wine taken for dropsy." It was a traditional European medicine used as a strong sudorific, analgesic and sedative with powerful narcotic properties, but was considered a "somewhat dangerous remedy". Internal use has fallen out of favor in Western herbalism due to its variable chemistry and toxicity, but it is used topically as a treatment for herpes zoster. There is much disagreement as to whether the leaves and fruit of S. nigrum are poisonous, but there are countries that grow this plant as a food crop. The toxicity of S. nigrum may vary by region and species. Native Hawaiians use the berries' juice as a laxative, they also boil young leaves to relieve sore throats and coughs.

S. nigrum is an important ingredient in traditional Indian medicines. Infusions are used for dysentery, stomach complaints, and fever. The juice of the plant is used on ulcers and other skin diseases. The fruits are used as a tonic, laxative, appetite stimulant, and for treating asthma and "excessive thirst". Traditionally the plant was used to treat tuberculosis. This plant's leaves are used to treat mouth ulcers that are common during winter in Tamil Nadu, India. In North India, the extracts of boiled leaves and berries are also used to alleviate liver-related ailments, including jaundice. The juice from its roots is used against asthma and whooping cough.

S. nigrum is also widely used in oriental medicine where it is considered to be antitumorigenic, antioxidant, anti-inflammatory, hepatoprotective, diuretic, and antipyretic.

Some experiments indicate that the plant can inhibit growth of cervical carcinoma in mice. The alkaloid solanine, seems to inhibit the proliferation of different cancer cells in vitro, such as breast and pancreatic cancer. Its anti-tumor mechanism is mainly through the induction of different cell and molecular pathways, leading to apoptosis and autophagy of cells and molecules, and inhibiting tumor metastasis in mice. Water extracts of Solanum nigrum have shown a citotoxic activity in reducing ROS generation of the human MM cell line A-375.

Solanum nigrum is known to contain solasodine (a steroidal glycoalkaloid that can be used to make 16-DPA progenitor); a possible commercial source could be via cultivating the hairy roots of this plant.

Through experiments on mice with gastric ulcers and a control group, the results showed that the extract of black nightshade powder and methanol could significantly affect the secretion of gastric acid and protease in mice, thus significantly reducing the gastric ulcer index of mice. Solanum nigrum, Tasmannia pepper leaf, anise myrtle and lemon myrtle share a high concentration of polyphenols and polysaccharides, which take a role in inhibition of iNOS and COX-2 activities. Experiments on several different cell lines resulted in "a viable approach to inhibit inflammation and carcinogenesis and to prevent cancer."

Uttroside B, a saponin, was identified as a bioactive chemotherapeutic agent, against hepatocellular carcinoma, obtained from the methanolic extract of S. nigrum. Lankalapalli et al. isolated uttroside B and provided its structure elucidation by derivatization, which afforded an enol ether, and characterized by detailed 2D NMR analysis in this publication. Uttroside B and uttroside A can be differentiated by the group present in C-22 with hydroxyl and methoxy groups, respectively. The structural resemblance of uttroside B and uttroside A poses a challenge in differentiation of these two molecules by NMR or other techniques. Recently, this group provided a correction of a NMR figure with respect to the structure of uttroside B, which enable differentiation of uttroside B from uttroside A with characteristic chemical shift difference in ^{13}C NMR of hemiketal carbon C-22 at 110.5 and 112.5 ppm, respectively. US-FDA granted an orphan drug designation for uttroside B against hepatocellular carcinoma.

== Cultivation ==
Black nightshade is cultivated as a food crop on several continents, including Africa and North America. The leaves of cultivated strains are eaten after cooking. A garden form with fruit about 1.27 cm (0.50 in) diam. is occasionally cultivated.

== Weed ==
Black nightshade can be a serious agricultural weed when it competes with crops. It has been reported as a weed in 61 countries and 37 crops. Herbicides are used extensively to control it in field crops such as cotton.
