= Fluorescence in situ hybridization =

Genetic testing technique

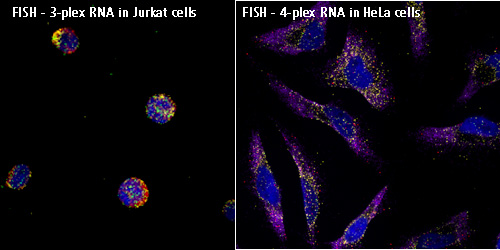
Multiplex RNA visualization in cells using ViewRNA FISH Assays

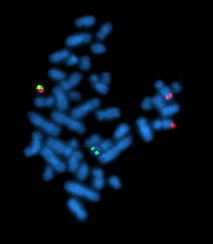
A metaphase cell positive for the bcr/abl rearrangement (associated with chronic myelogenous leukemia) using FISH. The chromosomes can be seen in blue. The chromosome that is labeled with green and red spots (upper left) is the one where the rearrangement is present.

Fluorescence in situ hybridization (FISH) is a molecular cytogenetic technique that uses fluorescent probes that bind to specific parts of a nucleic acid sequence with a high degree of sequence complementarity. It was developed by biomedical researchers in the early 1980s to detect and localize the presence or absence of specific DNA sequences on chromosomes. Fluorescence microscopy can be used to determine where the fluorescent probe is bound to the chromosomes. FISH is often used to find specific features in DNA for genetic counseling, medicine, and species identification.

FISH can also be used to detect and localize specific RNA targets (mRNA, lncRNA, and miRNA) in cells, circulating tumor cells, and tissue samples. In this context, it helps define the spatial and temporal patterns of gene expression within cells and tissues.

== Probes – RNA and DNA ==
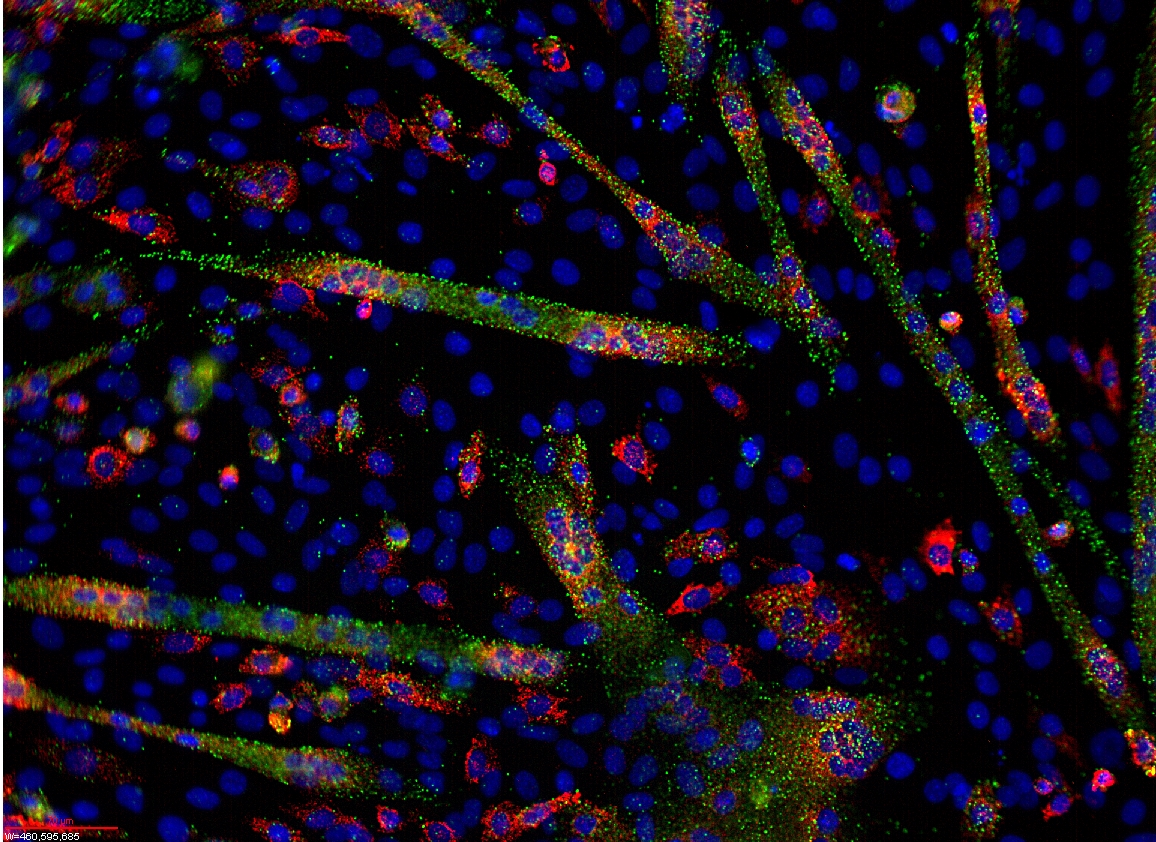
ViewRNA detection of miR-133(green) and myogenin mRNA (red) in C2C12 differentiating cells

In biology, a probe is a single strand of DNA or RNA that is complementary to a nucleotide sequence of interest.

RNA probes can be designed for any gene or any sequence within a gene for visualization of mRNA, lncRNA and miRNA in tissues and cells. FISH is used by examining the cellular reproduction cycle, specifically interphase of the nuclei for any chromosomal abnormalities. FISH allows the analysis of a large series of archival cases much easier to identify the pinpointed chromosome by creating a probe with an artificial chromosomal foundation that will attract similar chromosomes. The hybridization signals for each probe when a nucleic abnormality is detected. Each probe for the detection of mRNA and lncRNA is composed of ~20-50 oligonucleotide pairs, each pair covering a space of 40–50 bp. The specifics depend on the specific FISH technique used. For miRNA detection, the probes use proprietary chemistry for specific detection of miRNA and cover the entire miRNA sequence.

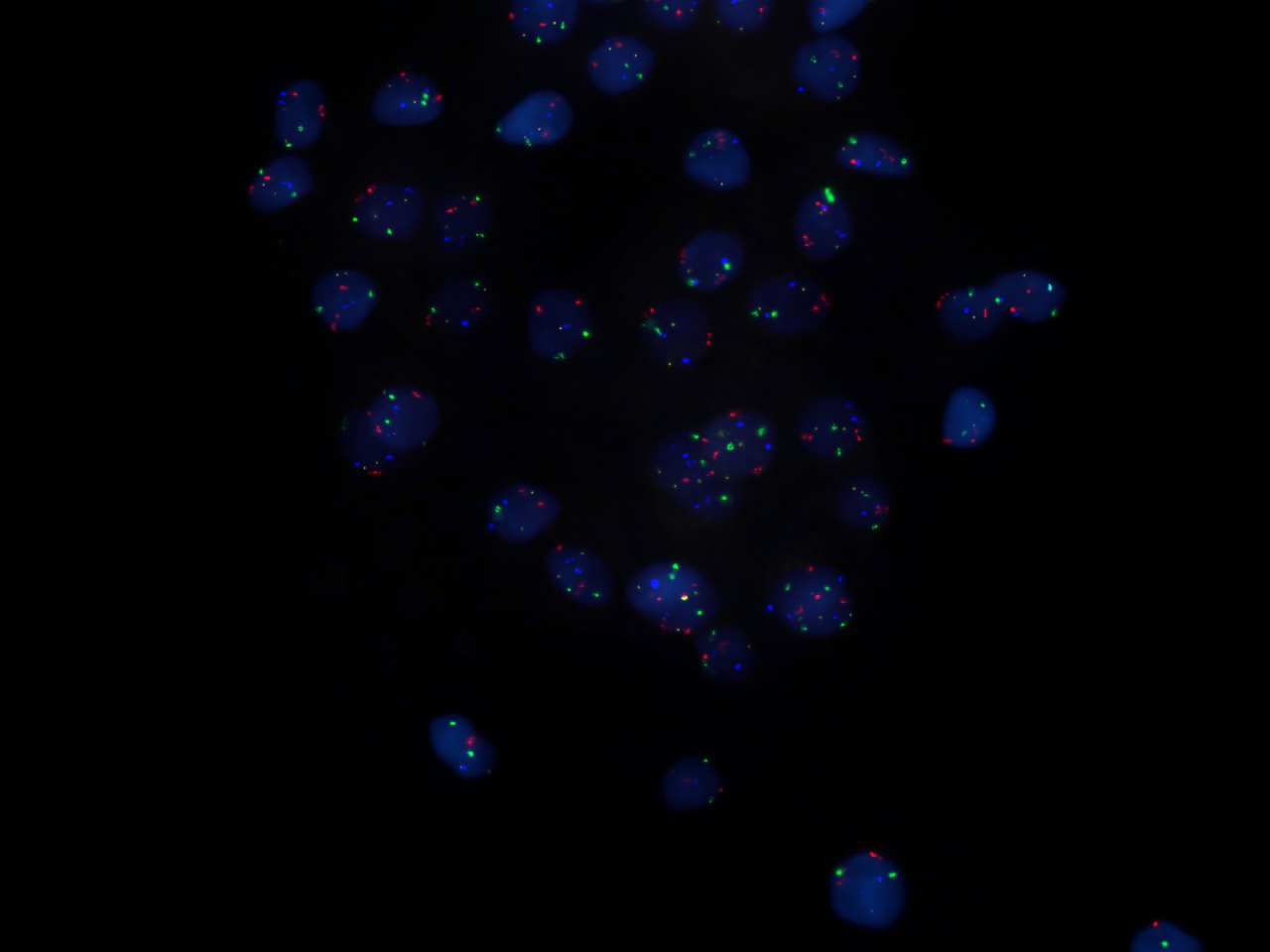
Urothelial cells marked with four different probes

Probes are often derived from fragments of DNA that were isolated, purified, and amplified for use in the Human Genome Project. The size of the human genome is so large, compared to the length that could be sequenced directly, that it was necessary to divide the genome into fragments. (In the eventual analysis, these fragments were put into order by digesting a copy of each fragment into still smaller fragments using sequence-specific endonucleases, measuring the size of each small fragment using size-exclusion chromatography, and using that information to determine where the large fragments overlapped one another.) To preserve the fragments with their individual DNA sequences, the fragments were added into a system of continually replicating bacteria populations. Clonal populations of bacteria, each population maintaining a single artificial chromosome, are stored in various laboratories around the world. The artificial chromosomes (BAC) can be grown, extracted, and labeled, in any lab containing a library. Genomic libraries are often named after the institution in which they were developed. An example being the RPCI-11 library, which is named after Roswell Park Comprehensive Cancer Center (formerly known as Roswell Park Cancer Institute) in Buffalo, New York. These fragments are on the order of 100 thousand base-pairs, and are the basis for most FISH probes.

=== Preparation and hybridization process – RNA ===
The purpose of using RNA FISH is to detect target mRNA transcripts in cells, tissue sections, or even whole-mounts. The process is done in 3 main procedures: tissue preparation (pre-hybridization), hybridization, and washing (post-hybridization).

The tissue preparation starts by collecting the appropriate tissue sections to perform RNA FISH. First, cells, circulating tumor cells (CTCs), formalin-fixed paraffin-embedded (FFPE), or frozen tissue sections are "fixed." Fixing involves treating live cells with a chemical fixative like 4% formaldehyde or paraformaldehyde (PFA) in phosphate buffered saline (PBS). This fixative process essentially "preserves" the structural integrity of the cells prior to permeabilization of the cell membrane which is normally conducted with a detergent like triton-X, which is pertinent for cell staining as dead cells no longer have a functioning membrane. Cell permeabilization can also be done using a 70% ethanol solution and overnight refrigeration. However, FISH has also been successfully done on unfixed cells. After fixation, samples are permeabilized to allow the penetration of hybridization reagents. The use of detergents at a 0.1% concentration is commonly used to enhance the tissue permeability such as Tween-20 or Triton X-100.

It is critical for the hybridization process to have all optimal conditions to have a successful in situ result, including temperature, pH, salt concentration, and time of the hybridization reaction. After checking all the necessary conditions, hybridization steps can be started by first adding a target-specific probe, composed of 20 oligonucleotide pairs, hybridizes to the target RNA(s). Separate but compatible signal amplification systems enable the multiplex assay (up to two targets per assay). Signal amplification is achieved via series of sequential hybridization steps.

After the hybridization steps, washing steps are performed. These steps aim to remove nonspecific hybrids and get rid of unbound probe molecules from the samples to reduce any background signaling. The use of ethanol washes are typically used at this stage to reduce autofluorescence in tissues or cells. At the end of the assay the tissue samples are visualized under a fluorescence microscope such as the confocal fluorescence microscope and the Keyence microscope.

=== Preparation and hybridization process – DNA ===
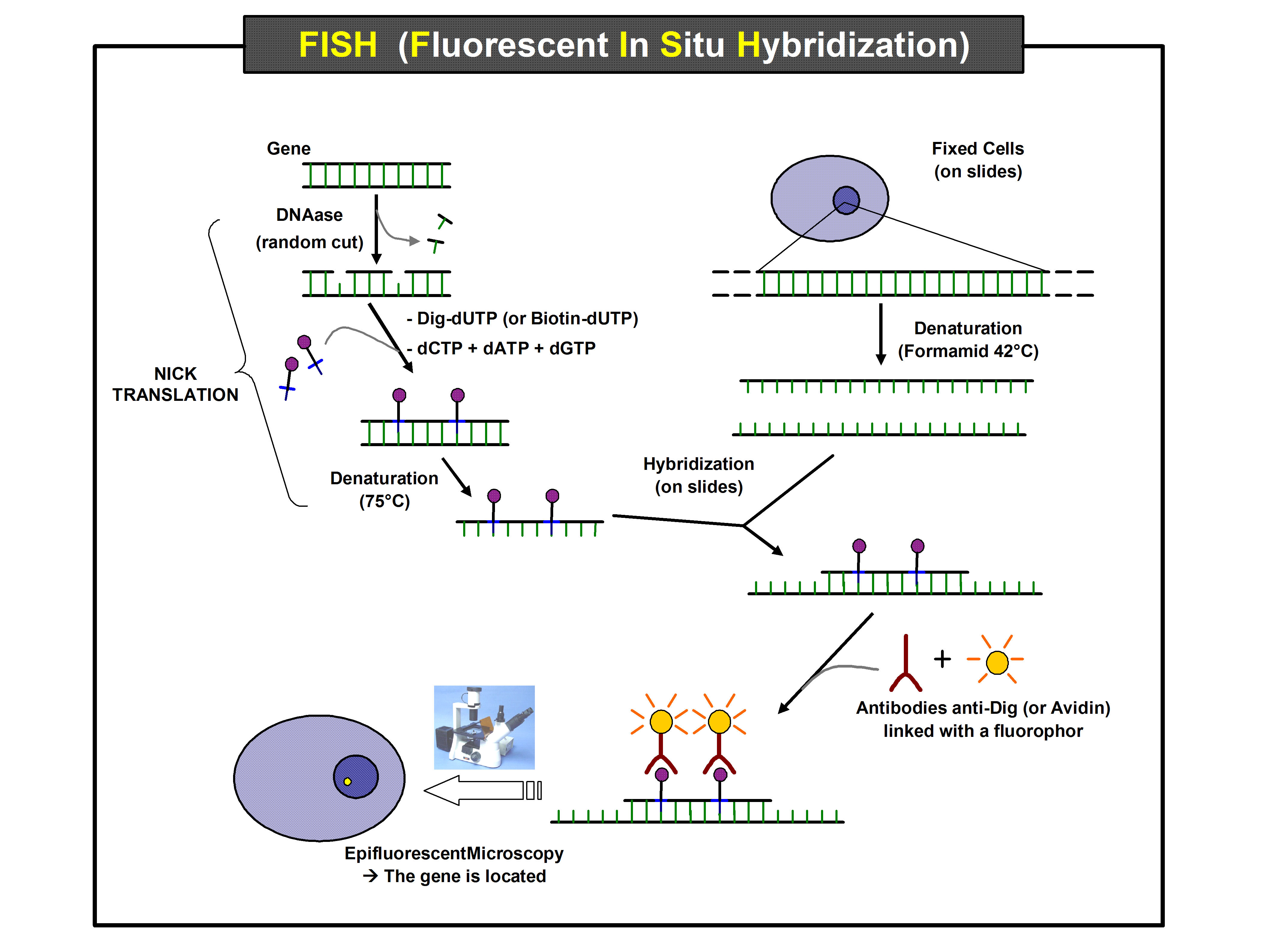
Scheme of the principle of the FISH Experiment to localize a gene in the nucleus.

First, a probe is constructed. The probe must be large enough to hybridize specifically with its target but not so large as to impede the hybridization process. The probe is tagged directly with fluorophores, with targets for antibodies or with biotin. Tagging can be done in various ways, such as nick translation, or polymerase chain reaction using tagged nucleotides.

Then, an interphase or metaphase chromosome preparation is produced. The chromosomes are firmly attached to a substrate, usually glass. Repetitive DNA sequences must be blocked by adding short fragments of DNA to the sample. The probe is then applied to the chromosome DNA and incubated for approximately 12 hours while hybridizing. Several wash steps remove all unhybridized or partially hybridized probes. The results are then visualized and quantified using a microscope that is capable of exciting the dye and recording images.

If the fluorescent signal is weak, amplification of the signal may be necessary in order to exceed the detection threshold of the microscope. Fluorescent signal strength depends on many factors such as probe labeling efficiency, the type of probe, and the type of dye. Fluorescently tagged antibodies or streptavidin are bound to the dye molecule. These secondary components are selected so that they have a strong signal.

== Variations on probes and analysis ==
FISH is a very general technique. The differences between the various FISH techniques are usually due to variations in the sequence and labeling of the probes; and how they are used in combination. Probes are divided into two generic categories: cellular and acellular. In fluorescent "in situ" hybridization refers to the cellular placement of the probe.

Probe size is important because shorter probes hybridize less specifically than longer probes, so that long enough strands of DNA or RNA (often 10–25 nucleotides) which are complementary to a given target sequence are often used to locate a target. The overlap defines the resolution of detectable features. For example, if the goal of an experiment is to detect the breakpoint of a translocation, then the overlap of the probes — the degree to which one DNA sequence is contained in the adjacent probes — defines the minimum window in which the breakpoint may be detected.

The mixture of probe sequences determines the type of feature the probe can detect. Probes that hybridize along an entire chromosome are used to count the number of a certain chromosome, show translocations, or identify extra-chromosomal fragments of chromatin. This is often called "whole-chromosome painting." If every possible probe is used, every chromosome, (the whole genome) would be marked fluorescently, which would not be particularly useful for determining features of individual sequences. However, it is possible to create a mixture of smaller probes that are specific to a particular region (locus) of DNA; these mixtures are used to detect deletion mutations. When combined with a specific color, a locus-specific probe mixture is used to detect very specific translocations. Special locus-specific probe mixtures are often used to count chromosomes, by binding to the centromeric regions of chromosomes, which are distinctive enough to identify each chromosome (with the exception of Chromosome 13, 14, 21, 22.)

A variety of other techniques uses mixtures of differently colored probes. A range of colors in mixtures of fluorescent dyes can be detected, so each human chromosome can be identified by a characteristic color using whole-chromosome probe mixtures and a variety of ratios of colors. Although there are more chromosomes than easily distinguishable fluorescent dye colors, ratios of probe mixtures can be used to create secondary colors. Similar to comparative genomic hybridization, the probe mixture for the secondary colors is created by mixing the correct ratio of two sets of differently colored probes for the same chromosome. This technique is sometimes called M-FISH.

The same physics that make a variety of colors possible for M-FISH can be used for the detection of translocations. That is, colors that are adjacent appear to overlap; a secondary color is observed. Some assays are designed so that the secondary color will be present or absent in cases of interest. An example is the detection of BCR/ABL translocations, where the secondary color indicates disease. This variation is often called double-fusion FISH or D-FISH. In the opposite situation—where the absence of the secondary color is pathological—is illustrated by an assay used to investigate translocations where only one of the breakpoints is known or constant. Locus-specific probes are made for one side of the breakpoint and the other intact chromosome. In normal cells, the secondary color is observed, but only the primary colors are observed when the translocation occurs. This technique is sometimes called "break-apart FISH".

=== Single-molecule RNA FISH ===
Single-molecule RNA FISH, also known as Stellaris® RNA FISH or smFISH, is a method of detecting and quantifying mRNA and other long RNA molecules in a thin layer of tissue sample. Targets can be reliably imaged through the application of multiple short singly labeled oligonucleotide probes. The binding of up to 48 fluorescent labeled oligos to a single molecule of mRNA provides sufficient fluorescence to accurately detect and localize each target mRNA in a wide-field fluorescent microscopy image. Probes not binding to the intended sequence do not achieve sufficient localized fluorescence to be distinguished from background.

Single-molecule RNA FISH assays can be performed in simplex or multiplex, and can be used as a follow-up experiment to quantitative PCR, or imaged simultaneously with a fluorescent antibody assay. The technology has potential applications in cancer diagnosis, neuroscience, gene expression analysis, and companion diagnostics.

=== FIBRE FISH ===
In an alternative technique to interphase or metaphase preparations, fiber FISH, interphase chromosomes are attached to a slide in such a way that they are stretched out in a straight line, rather than being tightly coiled, as in conventional FISH, or adopting a chromosome territory conformation, as in interphase FISH. This is accomplished by applying mechanical shear along the length of the slide, either to cells that have been fixed to the slide and then lysed, or to a solution of purified DNA. A technique known as chromosome combing is increasingly used for this purpose. The extended conformation of the chromosomes allows dramatically higher resolution – even down to a few kilobases. The preparation of fiber FISH samples, although conceptually simple, is a rather skilled art, and only specialized laboratories use the technique routinely.

=== Q-FISH ===
Q-FISH combines FISH with PNAs and computer software to quantify fluorescence intensity. This technique is used routinely in telomere length research.

=== Flow-FISH ===
Flow-FISH uses flow cytometry to perform FISH automatically using per-cell fluorescence measurements.

=== MA-FISH ===
Microfluidics-assisted FISH (MA-FISH) uses a microfluidic flow to increase DNA hybridization efficiency, decreasing expensive FISH probe consumption and reduce the hybridization time. MA-FISH is applied for detecting the HER2 gene in breast cancer tissues.

=== MAR-FISH ===
Microautoradiography FISH is a technique to combine radio-labeled substrates with conventional FISH to detect phylogenetic groups and metabolic activities simultaneously.

=== Hybrid Fusion-FISH ===
Hybrid Fusion FISH (HF-FISH) uses primary additive excitation/emission combination of fluorophores to generate additional spectra through a labeling process known as dynamic optical transmission (DOT). Three primary fluorophores are able to generate a total of 7 readily detectable emission spectra as a result of combinatorial labeling using DOT. Hybrid Fusion FISH enables highly multiplexed FISH applications that are targeted within clinical oncology panels. The technology offers faster scoring with efficient probesets that can be readily detected with traditional fluorescent microscopes.

=== MERFISH ===
Multiplexed error-robust fluorescence in situ hybridization is a highly multiplexed version of smFISH. It uses combinatorial labeling, followed by imaging, and then error-resistant encoding to capture a high number of RNA molecules and spatial localization within the cell. The capture of a large number of RNA molecules enables elucidation of gene regulatory networks, prediction of function of unannotated genes, and identification of RNA molecule distribution patterns, which correlate with their associated proteins.

=== STARFISH ===
Starfish is a set of software tools developed in 2019 by a consortium of scientists to analyze data from nine different variations of FISH, since all variations produce the same set of data—gene expression values mapped to x and y coordinates in a cell. The software, created for all scientists, not just bioinformaticians, reads a set of images, removes noise, and identifies RNA molecules. This approach has set out to define a standard analysis scheme of FISH datasets in a similar way to single-cell transcriptomics analysis.

== Medical applications ==
Often parents of children with a developmental disability want to know more about their child's conditions before choosing to have another child. These concerns can be addressed by analysis of the parents' and child's DNA. In cases where the child's developmental disability is not understood, the cause of it can potentially be determined using FISH and cytogenetic techniques. Examples of diseases that are diagnosed using FISH include Prader-Willi syndrome, Angelman syndrome, 22q13 deletion syndrome, chronic myelogenous leukemia, acute lymphoblastic leukemia, Cri-du-chat, Velocardiofacial syndrome, and Down syndrome. FISH on sperm cells is indicated for men with an abnormal somatic or meiotic karyotype as well as those with oligozoospermia, since approximately 50% of oligozoospermic men have an increased rate of sperm chromosome abnormalities. The analysis of chromosomes 21, X, and Y is enough to identify oligozoospermic individuals at risk.

In medicine, FISH can be used to form a diagnosis, to evaluate prognosis, or to evaluate remission of a disease, such as cancer. Treatment can then be specifically tailored. A traditional exam involving metaphase chromosome analysis is often unable to identify features that distinguish one disease from another, due to subtle chromosomal features; FISH can elucidate these differences. FISH can also be used to detect diseased cells more easily than standard Cytogenetic methods, which require dividing cells and requires labor and time-intensive manual preparation and analysis of the slides by a technologist. FISH, on the other hand, does not require living cells and can be quantified automatically, a computer counts the fluorescent dots present. However, a trained technologist is required to distinguish subtle differences in banding patterns on bent and twisted metaphase chromosomes. FISH can be incorporated into Lab-on-a-chip microfluidic device. This technology is still in a developmental stage but, like other lab on a chip methods, it may lead to more portable diagnostic techniques.

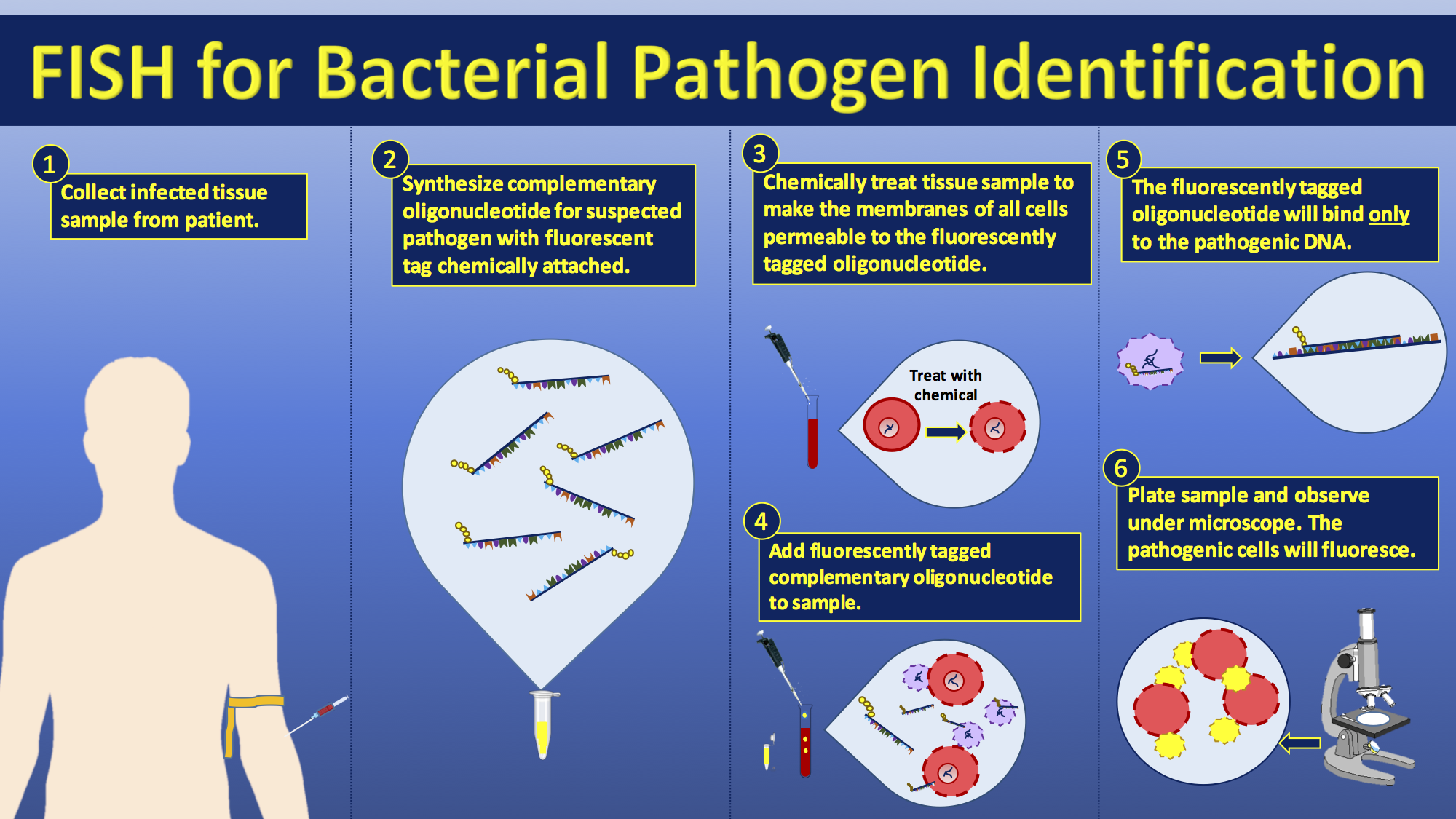
General process of fluorescent in situ hybridization (FISH) used for bacterial pathogen identification. First, an infected tissue sample is taken from the patient. Then an oligonucleotide complementary to the suspected pathogen's genetic code is chemically tagged with a fluorescent probe. The tissue sample is chemically treated in order to make the cell membranes permeable to the fluorescently tagged oligonucleotide. The fluorescent tag is then added and only binds to the complementary DNA of the suspected pathogen. If the pathogen is present in the tissue sample, then the pathogen's cells will fluoresce after treatment with the tagged oligonucleotide. No other cells will glow.

=== Species identification ===
FISH has been extensively studied as a diagnostic technique for the identification of pathogens in the field of medical microbiology. Although it has been proven to be a useful and applicable technique, it is still not widely applied in diagnostic laboratories. The short time to diagnosis (less than 2 hours) has been a major advantage compared with biochemical differentiation, but this advantage is challenged by MALDI-TOF-MS which allows the identification of a wider range of pathogens compared with biochemical differentiation techniques. Using FISH for diagnostic purposes has found its purpose when immediate species identification is needed, specifically for the investigation of blood cultures for which FISH is a cheap and easy technique for preliminary rapid diagnosis.

FISH can also be used to compare the genomes of two biological species, to deduce evolutionary relationships. A similar hybridization technique is called a zoo blot. Bacterial FISH probes are often primers for the 16s rRNA region.

FISH is widely used in the field of microbial ecology, to identify microorganisms. Biofilms, for example, are composed of complex (often) multi-species bacterial organizations. Preparing DNA probes for one species and performing FISH with this probe allows one to visualize the distribution of this specific species within the biofilm. Preparing probes (in two different colors) for two species allows researchers to visualize/study co-localization of these two species in the biofilm and can be useful in determining the fine architecture of the biofilm.

=== Comparative genomic hybridization ===
Comparative genomic hybridization can be described as a method that uses FISH in a parallel manner with the comparison of the hybridization strength to recall any major disruptions in the duplication process of the DNA sequences in the genome of the nucleus.

=== Spectral karyotype ===
Spectral karyotyping is an image of colored chromosomes. Spectral karyotyping involves FISH using multiple forms of many types of probes with the result to see each chromosome labeled through its metaphase stage. This type of karyotyping is used specifically when seeking out chromosome arrangements.

=== Alternatives ===
==== Virtual karyotype ====
Virtual karyotyping is another cost-effective, clinically available alternative to FISH panels using thousands to millions of probes on a single array to detect copy number changes, genome-wide, at unprecedented resolution. Currently, this type of analysis will only detect gains and losses of chromosomal material and will not detect balanced rearrangements, such as translocations and inversions which are hallmark aberrations seen in many types of leukemia and lymphoma.

== Chromosome evolution ==
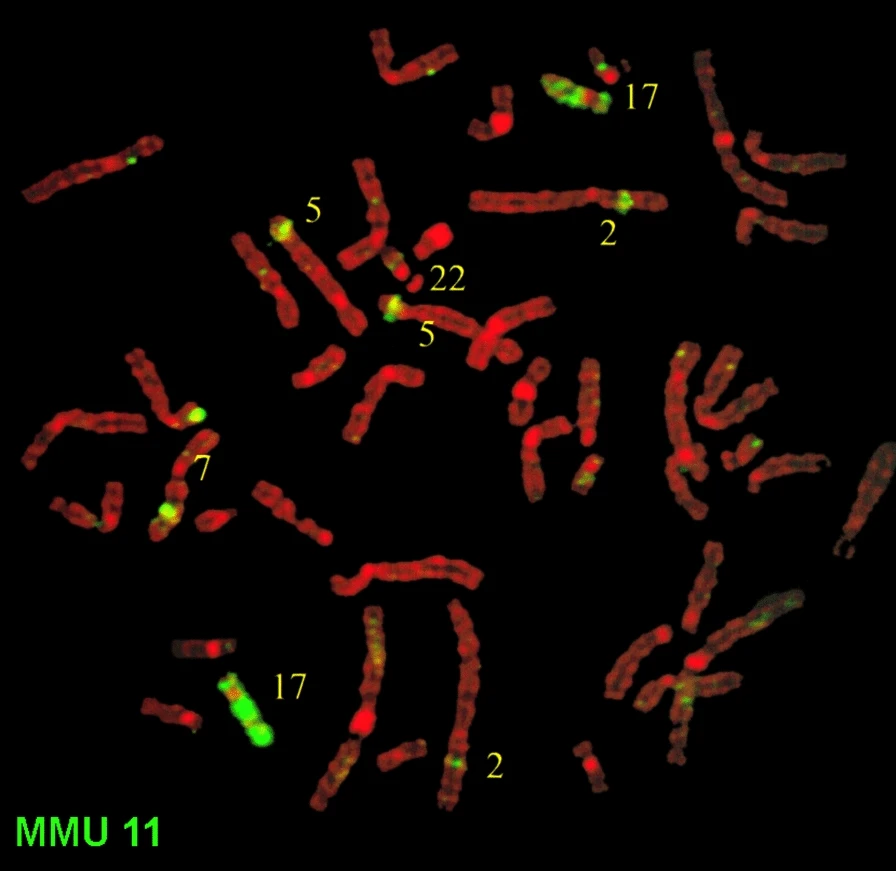
Human chromosomes painted with DNA from mouse chromosome 11 showing hybridization signals on human chromosomes 17, 5, 2, 7, and 22 and some other chromosomes. That is, an ancestral chromosome broke up into multiple fragments that can still be found in many human chromosomes.

FISH can be used to study the evolution of chromosomes. Species that are related have similar chromosomes. This homology can be detected by gene or genome sequencing but also by FISH. For instance, human and chimpanzee chromosomes are very similar, and FISH can demonstrate that the common ancestor of chimpanzees and humans had two smaller chromosomes, and in the human lineage these fused to result in one human chromosome. Similarly, species that are more distantly related, have similar chromosomes but with increasing genetic distance, chromosomes tend to break and fuse and thus result in mosaic chromosomes. This can be impressively demonstrated by FISH (see figure).

== See also ==
- Chromogenic in situ hybridization (CISH)
- Eukaryotic chromosome fine structure
- G banding
- Gene mapping
- Genome evolution
- Happy mapping
- In situ hybridization, the technique used for labelling
- Molecular cytogenetics
- Virtual karyotype

== Gallery ==
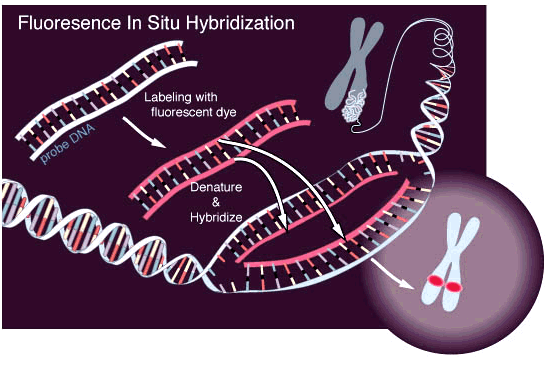
Another schematic of FISH process.

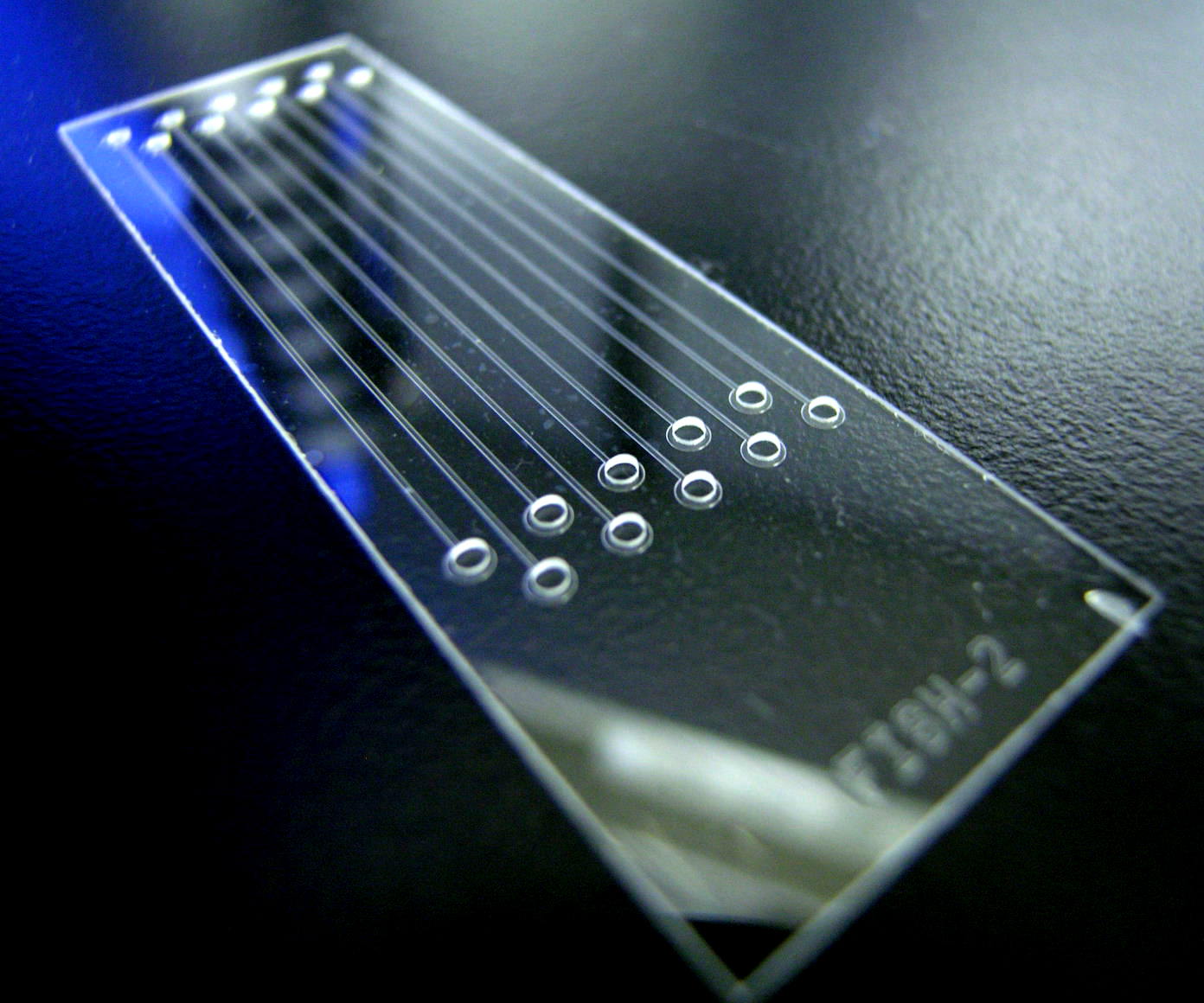
Microfluidic chip that lowered the cost-per-test of FISH by 90%.

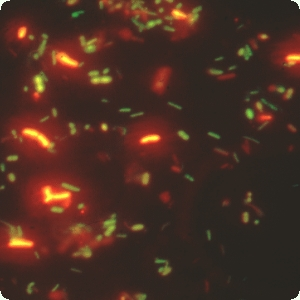
Dual label FISH image; Bifidobacteria Cy3, Total bacteria FITC.

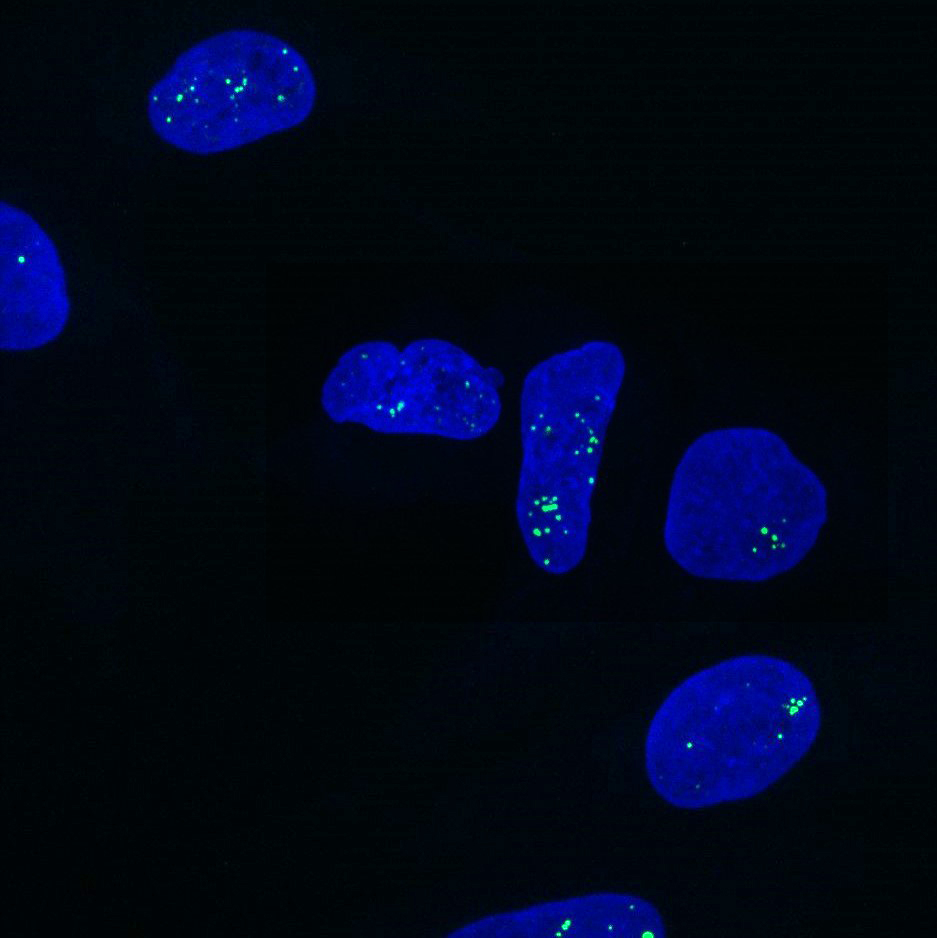
Paraspeckles visualized by single-molecule FISH against NEAT1 (Quasar 570) in U-2 OS cells (DAPI).
