= Popgenie =

The Populus Genome Integrative Explorer (PopGenIE)
Content
- Description: A community resource for the Populus genome.
- Organisms: Populus

Contact
- Research center: Umeå Plant Science Centre
- Primary citation: Sjödin & al. (2009)
- Release date: 2008

Access
- Website: http://popgenie.org
- Download URL: ftp://popgenie.org/popgenie/
- Web service URL: http://api.popgenie.org

Tools
- Web: GBrowse, JBrowse, DigitalNorthern, efp, ePlant, BLAST, BLAT, Insilico PCR, ExPlot, GOgraph

Miscellaneous
- License: MIT Licence
- Versioning: Populus trichocarpa v1.0/v2.0/v3.0
- Version: Populus trichocarpa v3.0

PopGenIE (Populus Genome Integrative Explorer) is an integrated set of tools for exploring the genome and transcriptome of the model plant system Populus.

PopGenie is a model organism database which brings together the increasingly extensive collection of genetics and genomics data created by the scientific community in a central resource. Such databases offer a single entry point to the collection of resources, typically including tools for exploring and querying those resources. PopGenIE contains an integrated set of tools including genome, synteny and quantitative trait locus browsers for exploring genetic data. Expression tools include an electronic fluorescent pictograph browser, expression profile plots, co-regulation within collated transcriptomics data sets, and identification of over-represented functional categories and genomic hotspot locations. A number of collated transcriptomics data sets are available in the browser to facilitate functional exploration of gene function. Additional homology and data extraction tools are provided. PopGenIE significantly increases accessibility to Populus genomics resources and allows exploration of transcriptomics data without the need to learn or understand complex statistical analysis methods.

There are various tools (ePlant.eXplot, PopNet...) available in PopGenIE to analyse biological data. PopGenIE also archived their old versions. All tools are under MIT lLicence.
