= CISH =

CISH or cish may refer to:

- Chromogenic in situ hybridization, a technique in molecular biology
- CISH (gene), coding for the cytokine-inducible SH2-containing protein
- cish (mathematics), a hyperbolic function in mathematics
- International Committee of Historical Sciences, also referred to as Comité International des Sciences Historiques (CISH) outside the anglosphere
