= Ribonomics =

Ribonomics is the study of ribonucleic acids (RNAs) associated with RNA-binding proteins (RBPs). The term was introduced by Robert Cedergren and colleagues who used a bioinformatic search tool to discover novel ribozymes and RNA motifs originally found in HIV. Ribonomics, like genomics or proteomics, is the large-scale, high-throughput approach to identifying subsets of RNAs by their association with proteins in cells. Since many messenger RNAs (mRNAs) are linked with multiple processes, this technique offers a facile mechanism to study the relationship of various intracellular systems. Prokaryotes co-regulate genes common to cellular processes via a polycistronic operon. Since eukaryotic transcription produces mRNA encoding proteins in a monocistronic fashion, many gene products must be concomitantly expressed (see gene expression) and translated in a timed fashion. RBPs are thought to be the molecules which physically and biochemically organize these messages to different cellular locales where they may be translated, degraded or stored. The study of transcripts associated with RBPs is therefore thought to be important in eukaryotes as a mechanism for coordinated gene regulation. The likely biochemical processes which account for this regulation are the expedited/delayed degradation of RNA. In addition to the influence on RNA half-life, translation rates are also thought to be altered by RNA-protein interactions. The Drosophila ELAV family, the Puf family in yeast, and the human La, Ro, and FMR proteins are known examples of RBPs, showing the diverse species and processes with which post-transcriptional gene regulation is associated.

== See also ==
- ELAVL1
- ELAVL2
- ELAVL3
- Transcript of unknown function
