= Synteny =

Co-localization of genetic loci on a chromosome, or the conservation of gene order

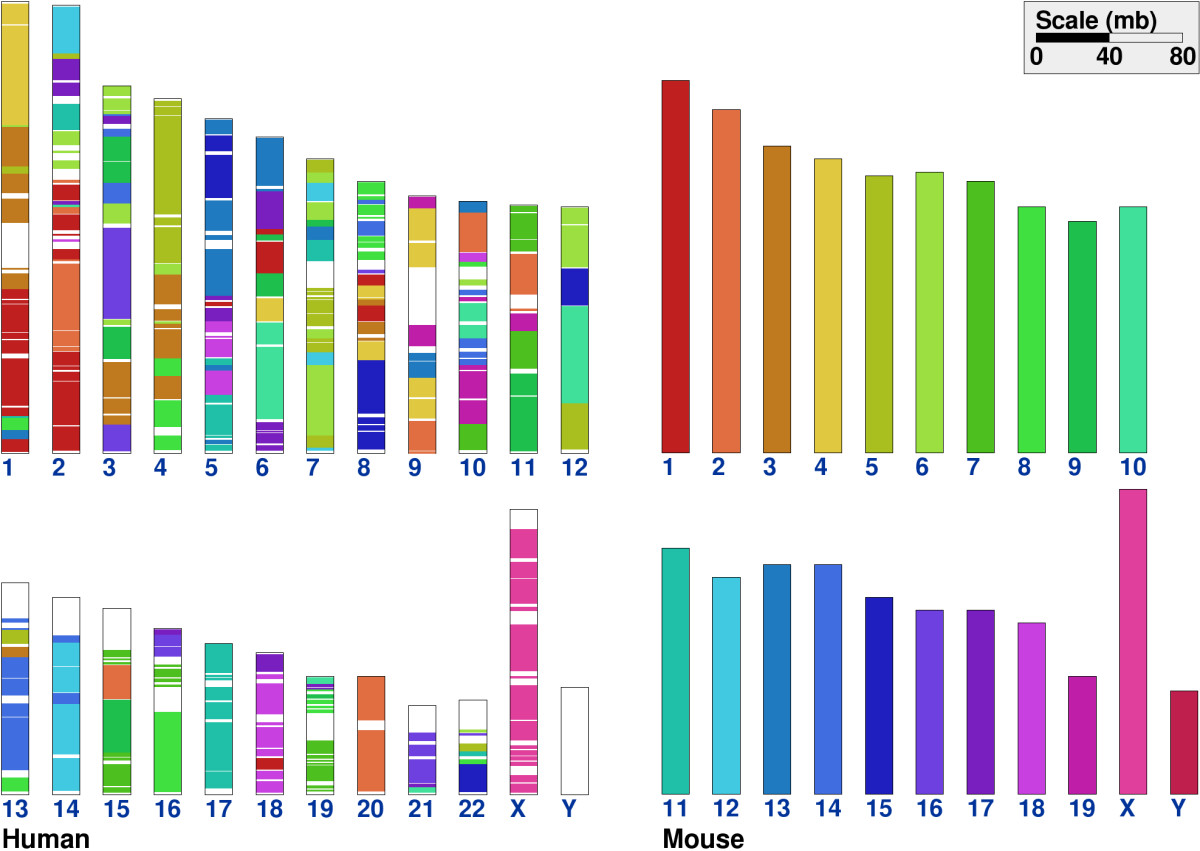
Synteny (in the modern sense) between human and mouse chromosomes. Colors in the human chromosomes indicate regions homologous with parts of the mouse chromosome of the same color. For instance, sequences homologous to mouse chromosome 1 are primarily on human chromosomes 1 and 2, but also 6, 8, and 18. The X chromosome is almost completely syntenic in both species.

In genetics, the term synteny refers to two related concepts:

- In classical genetics, synteny describes the physical co-localization of genetic loci on the same chromosome within an individual or species.
- In genomics, synteny more commonly refers to colinearity, i.e. conservation of blocks of order within two sets of chromosomes that are being compared with each other. These blocks are referred to as syntenic blocks.

The Encyclopædia Britannica gives the following description of synteny, using the modern definition:

Genomic sequencing and mapping have enabled comparison of the general structures of genomes of many different species. The general finding is that organisms of relatively recent divergence show similar blocks of genes in the same relative positions in the genome. This situation is called synteny, translated roughly as possessing common chromosome sequences. For example, many of the genes of humans are syntenic with those of other mammals—not only apes but also cows, mice, and so on. Study of synteny can show how the genome is cut and pasted in the course of evolution.

== Etymology ==
Synteny is a neologism meaning "on the same ribbon"; Greek: σύν, syn "along with" + ταινία, tainiā "band". This can be interpreted classically as "on the same chromosome", or in the modern sense of having the same order of genes on two (homologous) strings of DNA (or chromosomes).

== Classical concept: co-localization on a chromosome ==
The classical concept is related to genetic linkage: Linkage between two loci is established by the observation of lower-than-expected recombination frequencies between them. In contrast, any loci on the same chromosome are by definition syntenic, even if their recombination frequency cannot be distinguished from unlinked loci by practical experiments. Thus, in theory, all linked loci are syntenic, but not all syntenic loci are necessarily linked. Similarly, in genomics, the genetic loci on a chromosome are syntenic regardless of whether this relationship can be established by experimental methods such as DNA sequencing/assembly, genome walking, physical localization or hap-mapping.

Students of (classical) genetics employ the term synteny to describe the situation in which two genetic loci have been assigned to the same chromosome but still may be separated by a large enough distance in map units that genetic linkage has not been demonstrated.

=== Across evolution: shared synteny ===
Shared synteny (also known as conserved synteny) describes preserved co-localization of genes on chromosomes of different species. During evolution, rearrangements to the genome such as chromosome translocations may separate two loci, resulting in the loss of synteny between them. Conversely, translocations can also join two previously separate pieces of chromosomes together, resulting in a gain of synteny between loci. Stronger-than-expected shared synteny can reflect selection for functional relationships between syntenic genes, such as combinations of alleles that are advantageous when inherited together, or shared regulatory mechanisms.

In light of the more recent shift in the meaning of synteny, this conservation of gene content and linkage without preservation of order has also been termed mesosynteny.

== Current concept: gene-order preservation ==
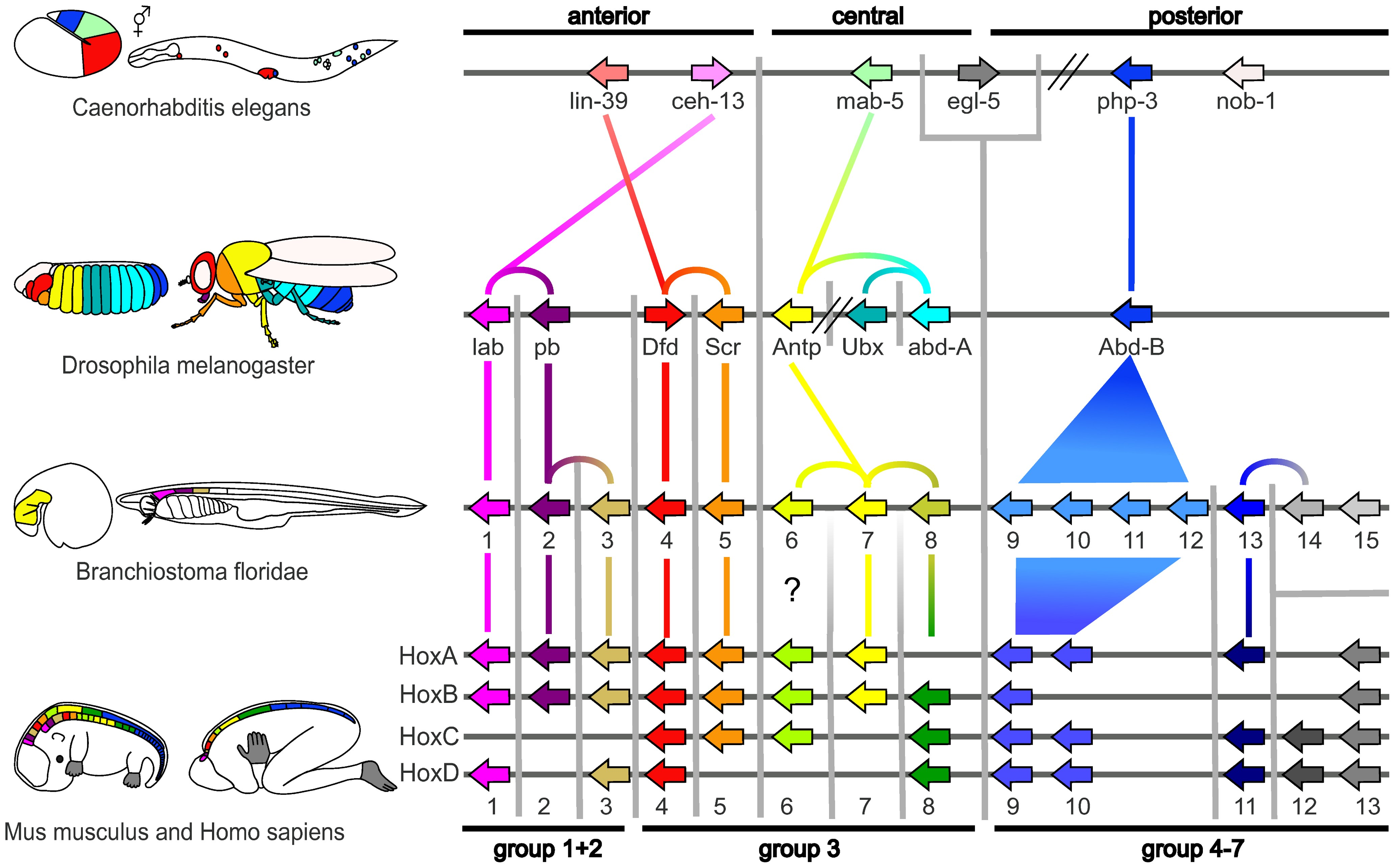
Synteny of Hox gene clusters; lines indicate homology

The term is currently (since ~2000) more commonly used to describe preservation of the precise order of genes on a chromosome passed down from a common ancestor, despite more "old school" geneticists rejecting what they perceive as a misappopriation of the term, preferring collinearity instead.

The analysis of synteny in the gene order sense has several applications in genomics. Shared synteny is one of the most reliable criteria for establishing the orthology of genomic regions in different species. Additionally, exceptional synteny can reflect important functional relationships between genes. For example, the order of genes in the "Hox cluster", which are key determinants of the animal body plan and which interact with each other in critical ways, is essentially preserved throughout the animal kingdom.

Synteny is widely used in studying complex genomes, as comparative genomics allows the presence and possibly function of genes in a simpler, model organism to infer those in a more complex one. For example, wheat has a very large, complex genome which is difficult to study. In 1994 research from the John Innes Centre in England and the National Institute of Agrobiological Research in Japan demonstrated that the much smaller rice genome had a similar structure and gene order to that of wheat. Further study found that many cereals are syntenic and thus plants such as rice or the grass Brachypodium could be used as a model to find genes or genetic markers of interest which could be used in wheat breeding and research. In this context, synteny was also essential in identifying a highly important region in wheat, the Ph1 locus involved in genome stability and fertility, which was located using information from syntenic regions in rice and Brachypodium.

Synteny is also widely used in microbial genomics. In Hyphomicrobiales and Enterobacteriales, syntenic genes encode a large number of essential cell functions and represent a high level of functional relationships.

Patterns of shared synteny or synteny breaks can also be used as characters to infer the phylogenetic relationships among several species, and even to infer the genome organization of extinct ancestral species. A qualitative distinction is sometimes drawn between macrosynteny, synteny in large portions of a chromosome, and microsynteny, synteny for only a few genes at a time.

== Computational detection ==
Shared synteny between different species can be inferred from their genomic sequences. This is typically done using a version of the MCScan algorithm, which finds syntenic blocks between species by comparing their homologous genes and looking for common patterns of collinearity on a chromosomal or contig scale. Homologies are usually determined on the basis of high bit score BLAST hits that occur between multiple genomes. From here, dynamic programming is used to select the best scoring path of shared homologous genes between species, taking into account potential gene loss and gain which may have occurred in the species' evolutionary histories.

== See also ==
- Ridge (biology)
- Ultra-conserved element
- Comparative genomics
