= Chromosome combing =

Chromosome combing (also known as molecular combing or DNA combing) is a technique used to produce an array of uniformly stretched DNA that is then highly suitable for nucleic acid hybridization studies such as fluorescent in situ hybridisation (FISH) which benefit from the uniformity of stretching, the easy access to the hybridisation target sequences, and the resolution offered by the large distance between two probes, which is due to the stretching of the DNA by a factor of 1.5 times the crystallographic length of DNA.

DNA in solution (i.e. with a randomly-coiled structure) is stretched by retracting the meniscus of the solution at a constant rate (typically 300 μm/s). The ends of DNA strands, which are thought to be frayed (i.e. open and exposing polar groups) bind to ionisable groups coating a silanized glass plate at a pH below the pKa of the ionizable groups (ensuring they are charged enough to interact with the ends of DNA). The rest of the DNA, which is mostly dsDNA, cannot form these interactions (aside from a few "touch down" segments along the length of the DNA strand) so is available for hybridisation to probes. As the meniscus retracts, surface retention creates a force that acts on DNA to retain it in the liquid phase; however this force is inferior to the strength of the DNA's attachment; the result is that the DNA is stretched as it enters the air phase; as the force acts in the locality of the air/liquid phase, it is invariant to different lengths or conformations of the DNA in solution, so DNA of any length will be stretched the same as the meniscus retracts. As this stretching is constant along the length of a DNA, distance along the strand can be related to base content; 1 μm is approximately equivalent to 2 kb.

DNA regions of interest are observed by hybridising them with probes labelled by haptens like biotin; this can then be bound by one or more layers of fluorochrome-associated ligands (such as immunofluorescence antibodies). Multicolour tagging is also possible. This has several potential uses, typically as a high-resolution physical mapping technique (e.g. for positional cloning), an example of which was the correct mapping of 200 kb of the CAPN3 gene region, or the mapping of non-overlapping sequences (since the distance between two probes can be accurately measured). It is therefore useful for finding exons, microdeletions, amplifications, or rearrangements. Before the combing improvement, FISH was too low-res to be of use in this case. With this technique, the resolution of FISH is theoretically limited only by the resolution of the epifluorescence microscope; in practice, resolutions of around 2 μm are obtained, for DNA molecules usually 200–600 kb long (though combing-FISH has been used with some success on molecules in excess of 1 Mb long), and there may be room for improvement through optimisation. Since DNA analyses using this technique are single-molecule, genomes from different cells can be compared to find anomalies, with implications for diagnosis of cancer and other genetic alterations.

Chromosome combing is also used to study DNA replication, a highly regulated process that is reliant on a specific program of temporal and spatial distribution of activation of origins of replication. Each origin occupies a distinct genetic locus and must fire only once per cell cycle. Chromosome combing allows a genome-wide view of the firing of origins and propagation of replication forks. As no assumptions are made about the sequence of the origins, this technique is particularly useful for mapping origins in eukaryotes, which are not thought to have precisely defined initiation sequences.

Strategies involving combing recently replicated DNA typically involve incorporating modified nucleotides (such as BrdU, bromodeoxyuridine) into the nascent DNA, then fluorescently detecting it. As replication forks spread bidirectionally from origins of replication at (approximately) equal speeds, then origin position can be inferred. Replacing the modified nucleotide pool with a different type of modified nucleotide after a certain amount of time allows development of a time-resolved picture of the firing of sites, and the kinetics of replication forks. Pause sites can be identified, merged replication forks resolved, and the frequency of origin firings in different time periods to be studied.

Firing frequencies have shown in in vitro studies of Xenopus laevis egg extract to increase as S phase progresses. In another study on Epstein-Barr virus episomes, hybridised probes were used to visualise the regional distribution of firing events; a particular zone showed preference for firing, whilst a few pause sites were also inferred.

Chromosome combing is performed by the company Genomic Vision, based in Paris.
