= Zoo blot =

A zoo blot or garden blot is a type of Southern blot that demonstrates the similarity between specific, usually protein-coding, DNA sequences of different species. A zoo blot compares animal species while a garden blot compares plant species. The purpose of the zoo blot is to detect the conservation of the gene(s) of interest throughout the evolution of different species.

In order to understand the degree to which a particular gene is similar from species to species, DNA extracts from a set of species are isolated and spread over a surface. Then, a gene probe specific to one of the species is labeled and allowed to hybridize to the prepared DNA. Usually, the probe is marked with a radioactive isotope of phosphorus. Following the hybridization, autoradiography or other imaging techniques are used to identify successfully hybridized probes, proof of similarity between species' genomes.

The hybridization between a probe and a segment of DNA will happen even when the strands are similar but not identical. As a result, zoo blotting is used to detect similar or exact relationships between the DNA in question and other organisms. It can also help establish the locations of introns and exons, as the latter will be far more conserved than the former.

== See also ==
- Southern blot
- Fluorescent in situ hybridization
