= Happy mapping =

In genetics, HAPPY Mapping, first proposed by Paul H. Dear and Peter R. Cook in 1989, is a method used to study the linkage between two or more DNA sequences. According to the Single Molecule Genomics Group, it is "Mapping based on the analysis of approximately HAPloid DNA samples using the PolYmerase chain reaction". In genomics, HAPPY mapping can be applied to assess the synteny and orientation of various DNA sequences across a particular genome - the generation of a "genomic" map.

As with linkage mapping, HAPPY mapping relies on the differential probability of two or more DNA sequences being separated. In genetic mapping, the probability of a recombination event between two genetic loci on the same chromosome is directly proportional to the distance between them. HAPPY mapping replaces recombination with fragmentation - instead of relying on recombination to separate genetic loci, the entire genome is fragmented, for example, by radiation or mechanical shearing. If the DNA is broken on a random basis, the longer the distance between two DNA sequences, the higher the chances of it to break between the two, and vice versa.

HAPPY mapping retains the benefits of genetic mapping while removing some of the problems associated with recombination. I.e., the need for polymorphism, and breeding. Also, recombination can be locale specific whereas breakage of genomic DNA by radiation or mechanical shearing seems to be more random. It has been used to genetically map several organisms.

HAPPY mapping has also been adapted to allow the precise analysis of copy-number variation, and in particular the analysis of copy-number changes in cancer.
