= Transcript of unknown function =

Known RNA transcripts of DNA whose function is unclear

Transcripts of unknown function (TUFs) is the name that has been suggested for known RNA transcripts of DNA whose function is unclear. Most are probably ncRNAs, such as RNAi or snoRNAs, but could also represent a whole new class of ncRNA. Their DNA sequences reside in the intergenic or intronic regions of the genome, which is often called junk DNA.

== Categories ==
Broadly speaking, TUFs can be classified into three categories:

1. TUFs that are complementary to sense transcripts of protein-coding genes
2. TUFs that are novel isoform transcripts of protein-coding genes; this can include expressed pseudogenes
3. TUFs that reside on the same strand as protein-coding genes in the intronic region or entirely in the intergenic region
