= Scillitoxin =

Scillitoxin (scillaine) is a chemical substance found in daffodils. It is a cardiac glucoside (a type of glycoside). with effects similar to digitoxin. The first, 1889, edition of the Merck Index lists: "Scilli-toxin (Scillain)" under the heading of "Squill (Scilla) preparations". It was stated in 1929 that "Scillitoxin has not been chemically identified as a definite chemical entity".
