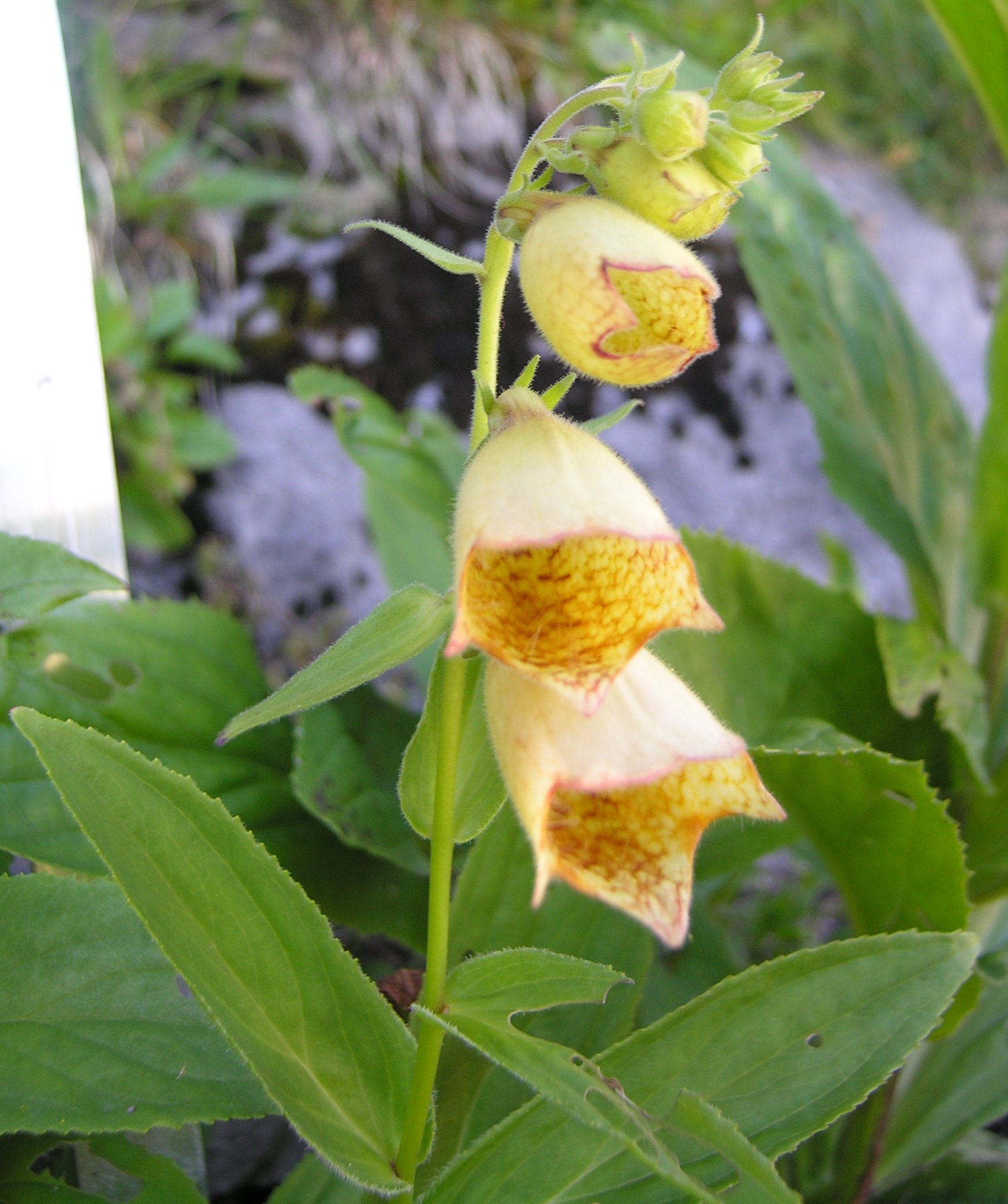
- At Schynige Platte

Scientific classification
- Kingdom: Plantae
- Clade: Tracheophytes
- Clade: Angiosperms
- Clade: Eudicots
- Clade: Asterids
- Order: Lamiales
- Family: Plantaginaceae
- Genus: Digitalis
- Species: D. grandiflora

Binomial name
- Digitalis grandiflora Mill.

= Digitalis grandiflora =

Species of foxglove

Digitalis grandiflora, the yellow foxglove, big-flowered foxglove, or large yellow foxglove, is a species of flowering plant in the genus Digitalis, family Plantaginaceae (formerly Scrophulariaceae). It is native to southern Europe and Asia. In mountains it grows on warm, bushy slopes or areas left after logging. The Latin specific epithet grandiflora means "large flowered".

== Description ==
It is a herbaceous perennial growing from a short rootstock with fibrous roots. D. grandiflora has glossy green, veined leaves, whose flowering stem can reach a height of 70–120 cm (28–47 in). The pale yellow bell-shaped flowers are spaced out on the stem, 3–4 cm (1–2 in) long and show a netted brown marking in their interior. In the wild, plants bloom in June and July.

== Cultivation ==
Digitalis grandiflora is long lived perennial, it has gained the Royal Horticultural Society's Award of Garden Merit. It is winter hardy is USDA zones 3 to 8 and grows best in moisture retentive, but well drained, organic soils in part shade. Cultivated plants in Germany bloom from June to August, in North America, flowering occurs from May to June in Missouri and from June to July in Ohio; with the typical bloom period lasting eight weeks.

=== Cultivars ===
- Digitalis grandiflora 'Carillon'
- Digitalis grandiflora 'Temple Bells'

== Hybrids ==
- Digitalis × fulva Lindl. (hybrid formula: Digitalis grandiflora Mill. × Digitalis purpurea L.)

== Pharmacology ==
As the plant contains cardenolides, all parts are toxic. Its leaves contain 0.2% glycosides of the digitoxin-type and about 0,1% of the digoxin-type. Even so, the plant is not used in the production of cardiac glycosides.

== Gallery ==
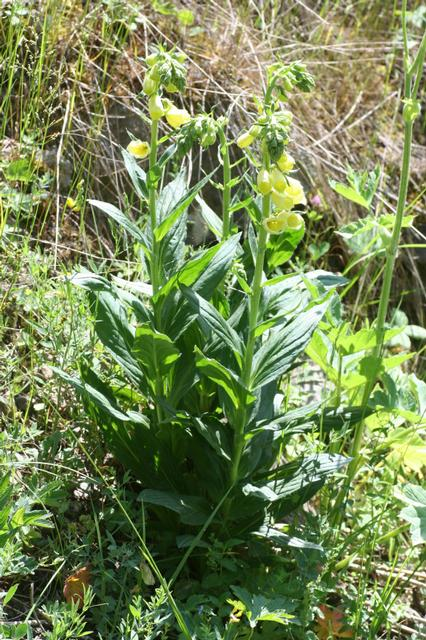
plant

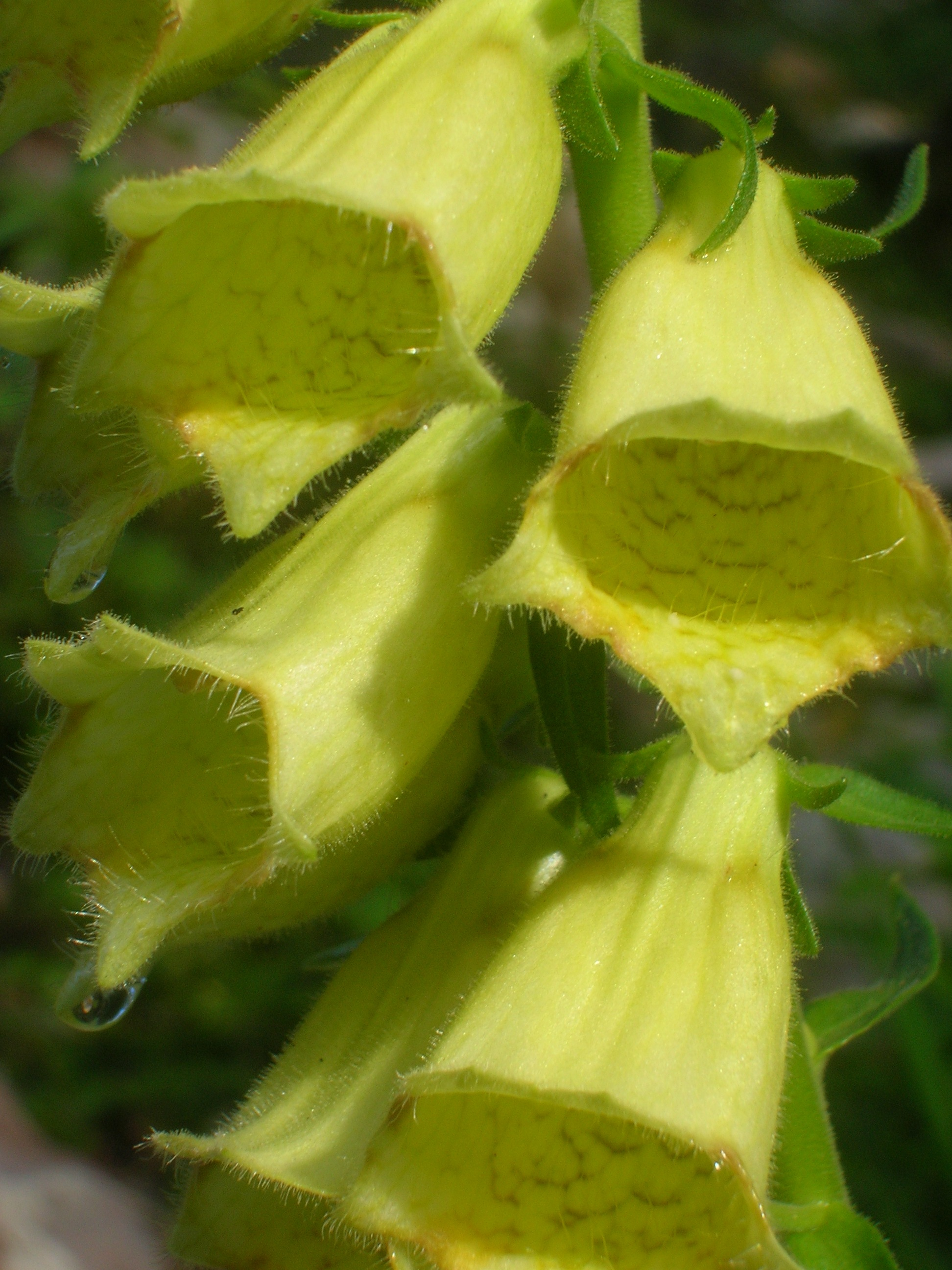
flowers

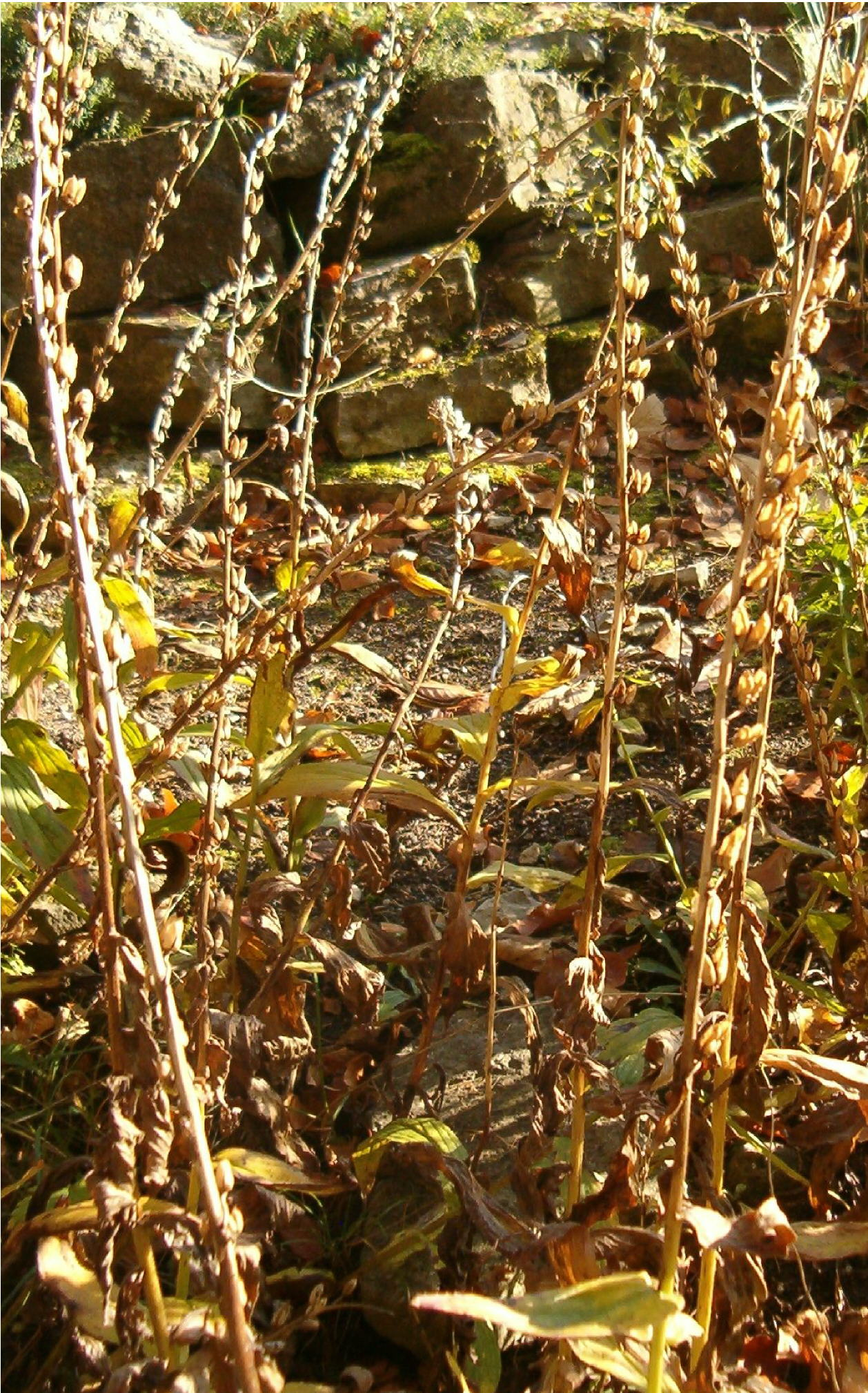
fruits
