= Sodium–potassium pump =

Ion channel enzyme pump found in the membrane of all animal cells

Na^{+}/K^{+}-ATPase pump
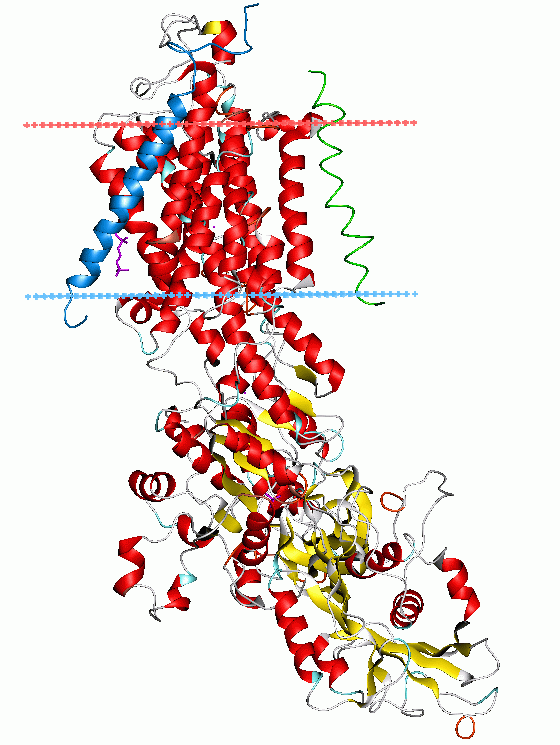
- Sodium–potassium pump, E2-Pi state. Calculated hydrocarbon boundaries of the lipid bilayer are shown as blue (intracellular) and red (extracellular) planes

Identifiers
- EC no.: 7.2.2.13

Databases
- BRENDA: enzyme data
- ExPASy: NiceZyme view
- KEGG: enzyme entry
- MetaCyc: metabolic pathway
- Rhea: reactions
- PDB structures: RCSB PDB PDBe PDBsum
Search
- PMC: articles
- PubMed: articles
- NCBI: proteins

Flow of ions

Alpha and beta units

The sodium–potassium pump (sodium–potassium adenosine triphosphatase, also known as Na^{+}/K^{+}-ATPase, Na^{+}/K^{+} pump, or sodium–potassium ATPase) is an enzyme (an electrogenic transmembrane ATPase) found in the cell membrane of all animal cells. It performs several functions in cell physiology.

The Na^{+}/K^{+}-ATPase enzyme is an enzyme involved in active transport (i.e. it uses energy from ATP). For every ATP molecule that the pump uses, three sodium ions are exported and two potassium ions are imported. Thus, there is a net export of a single positive charge per pump cycle. The net effect is an extracellular concentration of sodium ions 5 times the intracellular concentration, and an intracellular concentration of potassium ions 30 times the extracellular concentration.

The sodium–potassium pump was discovered in 1957 by the Danish scientist Jens Christian Skou, who was awarded a Nobel Prize for his work in 1997. Its discovery marked an important step forward in the understanding of how ions get into and out of cells, and its particular significance for excitable cells such as nerve cells, which depend on this pump to respond to stimuli and transmit impulses.

All mammals have four different sodium pump sub-types, or isoforms. Each has unique properties and tissue expression patterns. Sodium–potassium ATPase belongs to the family of P-type ATPases.

== Function ==
The Na^{+}/K^{+}-ATPase helps maintain resting potential, affects transport, and regulates cellular volume. It also functions as a signal transducer/integrator to regulate the MAPK pathway, reactive oxygen species (ROS), as well as intracellular calcium.

=== Energy expenditure ===
The Na^{+}/K^{+}-ATPase is an active enzyme. It uses energy from ATP to move ions against their concentration gradient. In fact, all cells expend a large fraction of the ATP they produce (typically 30% and up to 70% in nerve cells) to maintain their required cytosolic Na and K concentrations. For neurons, the Na^{+}/K^{+}-ATPase can be responsible for up to three-fourths of the cell's energy expenditure.

In many types of tissue, ATP consumption by the Na^{+}/K^{+}-ATPases have been related to glycolysis. This was first discovered in red blood cells (Schrier, 1966), but has later been evidenced in renal cells, smooth muscles surrounding the blood vessels, and cardiac cells which compose Purkinje fibers. Recently, glycolysis has also been shown to be of particular importance for Na^{+}/K^{+}-ATPase in skeletal muscles, where inhibition of glycogen breakdown (a substrate for glycolysis) leads to reduced Na^{+}/K^{+}-ATPase activity and lower force production.

=== Resting potential ===
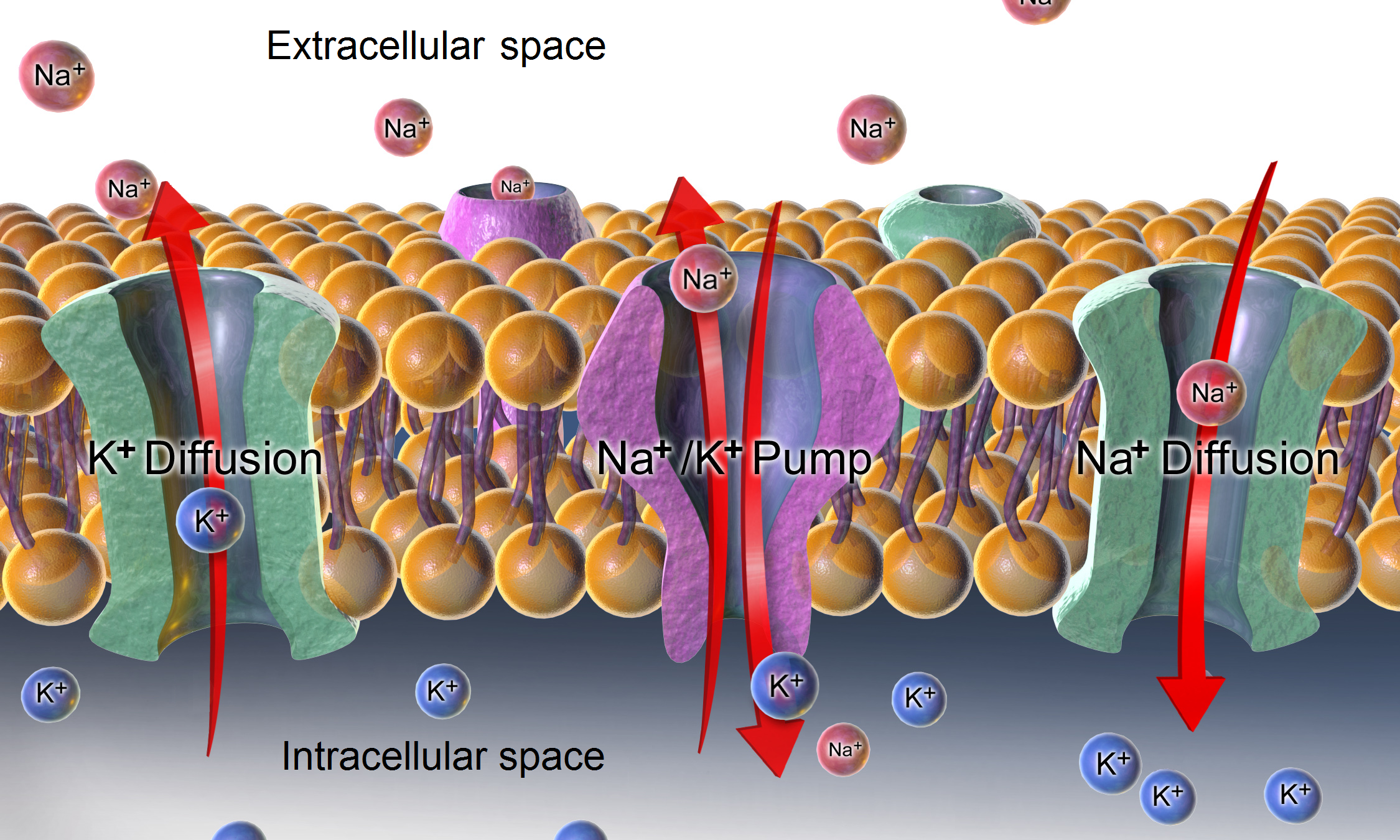
The Na^{+}/K^{+}-ATPase, as well as effects of diffusion of the involved ions maintain the resting potential across the membranes.

In order to maintain the cell membrane potential, cells keep a low concentration of sodium ions and high levels of potassium ions within the cell (intracellular). The sodium–potassium pump mechanism moves 3 sodium ions out and moves 2 potassium ions in, thus, in total, removing one positive charge carrier from the intracellular space (see § Mechanism for details). In addition, there is a short-circuit channel (i.e. a highly K-permeable ion channel) for potassium in the membrane, thus the voltage across the plasma membrane is close to the Nernst potential of potassium.

=== Reversal potential ===
Even if both K^{+} and Na^{+} ions have the same charge, they can still have very different equilibrium potentials for both outside and/or inside concentrations. The sodium-potassium pump moves toward a nonequilibrium state with the relative concentrations of Na^{+} and K^{+} for both inside and outside of cell. For instance, the concentration of K^{+} in cytosol is 100-140 mM, whereas the concentration of Na^{+} is 5-15 mM. On the other hand, in extracellular space, the usual concentration range of K^{+} is about 3.5-5 mM, whereas the concentration of Na^{+} is about 135-145 mM.

=== Transport ===
Export of sodium ions from the cell provides the driving force for several secondary active transporters such as membrane transport proteins, which import glucose, amino acids and other nutrients into the cell by use of the sodium ion gradient.

Another important task of the Na^{+}-K^{+} pump is to provide a Na^{+} gradient that is used by certain carrier processes. In the gut, for example, sodium is transported out of the reabsorbing cell on the blood (interstitial fluid) side via the Na^{+}-K^{+} pump, whereas, on the reabsorbing (lumenal) side, the Na^{+}-glucose symporter uses the created Na^{+} gradient as a source of energy to import both Na^{+} and glucose, which is far more efficient than simple diffusion. Similar processes are located in the renal tubular system.

=== Controlling cell volume ===
Failure of the Na^{+}-K^{+} pumps can result in swelling of the cell. A cell's osmotic concentration is the sum of the concentrations of the various ion species and many proteins and other organic compounds inside the cell. When this is higher than the osmotic concentration outside of the cell, water flows into the cell through osmosis. This will cause the cell to swell up and lyse. The Na^{+}-K^{+} pump helps to maintain the right concentrations of ions. Furthermore, when the cell begins to swell, this automatically activates the Na^{+}-K^{+} pump because it changes the internal concentrations of Na^{+}-K^{+} to which the pump is sensitive.

=== Functioning as signal transducer ===
Within the last decade, many independent labs have demonstrated that, in addition to the classical ion transporting, this membrane protein can also relay extracellular ouabain-binding signalling into the cell through regulation of protein tyrosine phosphorylation. For instance, a study investigated the function of Na^{+}/K^{+}-ATPase in foot muscle and hepatopancreas in land snail Otala lactea by comparing the active and estivating states. They concluded that reversible phosphorylation can control the same means of coordinating ATP use by this ion pump with the rates of the ATP generation by catabolic pathways in estivating O. lactea. The downstream signals through ouabain-triggered protein phosphorylation events include activation of the mitogen-activated protein kinase (MAPK) signal cascades, mitochondrial reactive oxygen species (ROS) production, as well as activation of phospholipase C (PLC) and inositol triphosphate (IP3) receptor (IP3R) in different intracellular compartments.

Protein-protein interactions play a very important role in Na^{+}-K^{+} pump-mediated signal transduction. For example, the Na^{+}-K^{+} pump interacts directly with Src, a non-receptor tyrosine kinase, to form a signaling receptor complex. Src is initially inhibited by the Na^{+}-K^{+} pump. However, upon subsequent ouabain binding, the Src kinase domain is released and then activated. Based on this scenario, NaKtide, a peptide Src inhibitor derived from the Na^{+}-K^{+} pump, was developed as a functional ouabain–Na^{+}-K^{+} pump-mediated signal transduction. Na^{+}-K^{+} pump also interacts with ankyrin, IP3R, PI3K, PLCgamma1 and cofilin.

=== Controlling neuron activity states ===
The Na^{+}-K^{+} pump has been shown to control and set the intrinsic activity mode of cerebellar Purkinje neurons, accessory olfactory bulb mitral cells and probably other neuron types. This suggests that the pump might not simply be a homeostatic, "housekeeping" molecule for ionic gradients, but could be a computation element in the cerebellum and the brain. Indeed, a mutation in the Na^{+}-K^{+} pump causes rapid onset dystonia-parkinsonism, which has symptoms to indicate that it is a pathology of cerebellar computation. Furthermore, an ouabain block of Na^{+}-K^{+} pumps in the cerebellum of a live mouse results in it displaying ataxia and dystonia. Alcohol inhibits sodium–potassium pumps in the cerebellum and this is likely how it corrupts cerebellar computation and body coordination. The distribution of the Na^{+}-K^{+} pump on myelinated axons in the human brain has been demonstrated to be along the internodal axolemma, and not within the nodal axolemma as previously thought. The Na^{+}-K^{+} pump disfunction has been tied to various diseases, including epilepsy and brain malformations.

== Mechanism ==
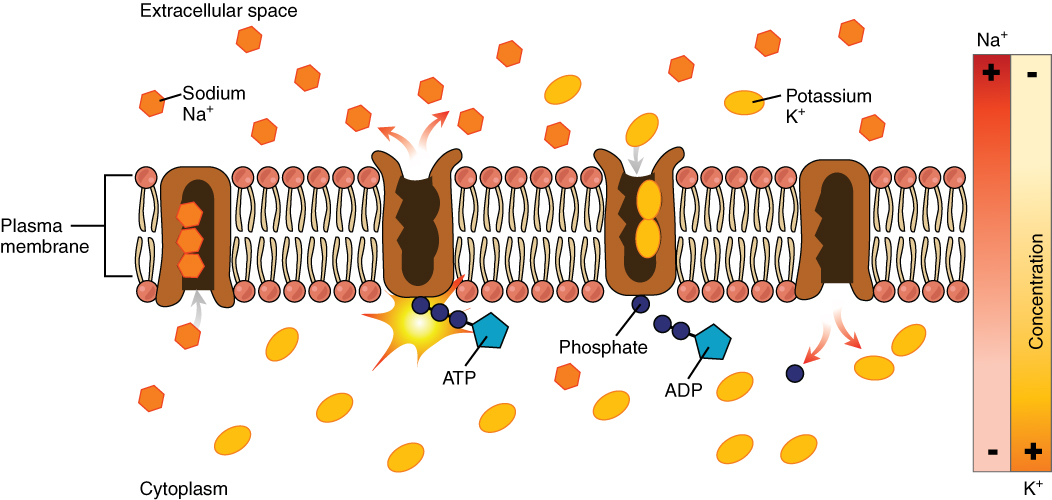
The sodium–potassium pump is found in many cell (plasma) membranes. Powered by ATP, the pump moves sodium and potassium ions in opposite directions, each against its concentration gradient. In a single cycle of the pump, three sodium ions are extruded from and two potassium ions are imported into the cell.

Looking at the process starting from the interior of the cell:

- The pump has a higher affinity for Na^{+} ions than K^{+} ions, thus after binding ATP, binds 3 intracellular Na^{+} ions.
- ATP is hydrolyzed, leading to phosphorylation of the pump at a highly conserved aspartate residue and subsequent release of ADP. This process leads to a conformational change in the pump.
- The conformational change exposes the Na^{+} ions to the extracellular region. The phosphorylated form of the pump has a low affinity for Na^{+} ions, so they are released; by contrast it has high affinity for the K^{+} ions.
- The pump binds 2 extracellular K^{+} ions, which induces dephosphorylation of the pump, reverting it to its previous conformational state, thus releasing the K^{+} ions into the cell.
- The unphosphorylated form of the pump has a higher affinity for Na^{+} ions. ATP binds, and the process starts again.

== Regulation ==
=== Endogenous ===
The Na^{+}/K^{+}-ATPase is upregulated by cAMP. Thus, substances causing an increase in cAMP upregulate the Na^{+}/K^{+}-ATPase. These include the ligands of the G_{s}-coupled GPCRs. In contrast, substances causing a decrease in cAMP downregulate the Na^{+}/K^{+}-ATPase. These include the ligands of the G_{i}-coupled GPCRs. Note: Early studies indicated the opposite effect, but these were later found to be inaccurate due to additional complicating factors.

The Na^{+}/K^{+}-ATPase is endogenously negatively regulated by the inositol pyrophosphate 5-InsP7, an intracellular signaling molecule generated by IP6K1, which relieves an autoinhibitory domain of PI3K p85α to drive endocytosis and degradation.

The Na^{+}/K^{+}-ATPase is also regulated by reversible phosphorylation. Research has shown that in estivating animals, the Na^{+}/K^{+}-ATPase is in the phosphorylated and low activity form. Dephosphorylation of Na^{+}/K^{+}-ATPase can recover it to the high activity form.

=== Exogenous ===
The Na^{+}/K^{+}-ATPase can be pharmacologically modified by administering drugs exogenously. Its expression can also be modified through hormones such as triiodothyronine, a thyroid hormone.

For instance, Na^{+}/K^{+}-ATPase found in the membrane of heart cells is an important target of cardiac glycosides (for example digoxin and ouabain), inotropic drugs used to improve heart performance by increasing its force of contraction.

Muscle contraction is dependent on a 100- to 10,000-times-higher-than-resting intracellular Ca^{2+} concentration, which is caused by Ca^{2+} release from the muscle cells' sarcoplasmic reticulum. Immediately after muscle contraction, intracellular Ca^{2+} is quickly returned to its normal concentration by a carrier enzyme in the plasma membrane, and a calcium pump in sarcoplasmic reticulum, causing the muscle to relax.

According to the Blaustein-hypothesis, this carrier enzyme (Na^{+}/Ca^{2+} exchanger, NCX) uses the Na gradient generated by the Na^{+}-K^{+} pump to remove Ca^{2+} from the intracellular space, hence slowing down the Na^{+}-K^{+} pump results in a permanently elevated Ca^{2+} level in the muscle, which may be the mechanism of the long-term inotropic effect of cardiac glycosides such as digoxin. The problem with this hypothesis is that at pharmacological concentrations of digitalis, less than 5% of Na/K-ATPase molecules – specifically the α2 isoform in heart and arterial smooth muscle (K_{d} = 32 nM) – are inhibited, not enough to affect the intracellular concentration of Na^{+}. However, apart from the population of Na/K-ATPase in the plasma membrane, responsible for ion transport, there is another population in the caveolae which acts as digitalis receptor and stimulates the EGF receptor.

=== Pharmacological regulation ===
In certain conditions such as in the case of cardiac disease, the Na^{+}/K^{+}-ATPase may need to be inhibited via pharmacological means. A commonly used inhibitor used in the treatment of cardiac disease is digoxin (a cardiac glycoside) which essentially binds "to the extracellular part of enzyme i.e. that binds potassium, when it is in a phosphorylated state, to transfer potassium inside the cell" After this essential binding occurs, a dephosphorylation of the alpha subunit occurs which reduces the effect of cardiac disease. It is via the inhibiting of the Na^{+}/K^{+}-ATPase that sodium levels will begin to increase within the cell which ultimately increases the concentration of intracellular calcium via the sodium-calcium exchanger. This increased presence of calcium is what allows for the force of contraction to be increased. In the case of patients where the heart is not pumping hard enough to provide what is needed for the body, use of digoxin helps to temporarily overcome this.

== Discovery ==
Na^{+}/K^{+}-ATPase was proposed by Jens Christian Skou in 1957 while working as assistant professor at the Department of Physiology, University of Aarhus, Denmark. He published his work that year.

In 1997, he received one-half of the Nobel Prize in Chemistry "for the first discovery of an ion-transporting enzyme, Na^{+},K^{+}-ATPase."

== Genes ==
- Alpha: ATP1A1, ATP1A2, ATP1A3, ATP1A4. ATP1A1 is expressed ubiquitously in vertebrates, and ATP1A3 in neural tissue. ATP1A2 is also known as "alpha(+)". ATP1A4 is specific to mammals.
- Beta: ATP1B1, ATP1B2, ATP1B3

ATP1B4, although closely related to ATP1B1, ATP1B2, and ATP1B3, lost its function as Na^{+}/K^{+}-ATPase beta subunit.

== Parallel evolution of cardiotonic steroid resistance in vertebrates ==
Several studies have detailed the evolution of cardiotonic steroid resistance of the alpha-subunit gene family of Na/K-ATPase (ATP1A) in vertebrates via amino acid substitutions most often located in the first extracellular loop domain. Amino acid substitutions conferring cardiotonic steroid resistance have evolved independently many times in all major groups of tetrapods. ATP1A1 has been duplicated in some groups of frogs and neofunctionlised duplicates carry the same cardiotonic steroid resistance substitutions (Q111R and N122D) found in mice, rats and other muroids.

== In insects ==
In Drosophila melanogaster, the alpha-subunit of Na^{+}/K^{+}-ATPase has two paralogs, ATPα (ATPα1) and JYalpha (ATPα2), resulting from an ancient duplication in insects. In Drosophila, ATPα1 is ubiquitously and highly expressed, whereas ATPα2 is most highly expressed in male testes and is essential for male fertility. Insects have at least one copy of both genes, and occasionally duplications. Low expression of ATPα2 has also been noted in other insects. Duplications and neofunctionalization of ATPα1 have been observed in insects that are adapted to cardiotonic steroid toxins such as cardenolides and bufadienolides. Insects adapted to cardiotonic steroids typically have a number of amino acid substitutions, most often in the first extra-cellular loop of ATPα1, that confer resistance to cardiotonic steroid inhibition.

== See also ==
- Sodium-calcium exchanger
- Thyroid hormone
- V-ATPase
