= Daigremontianin =

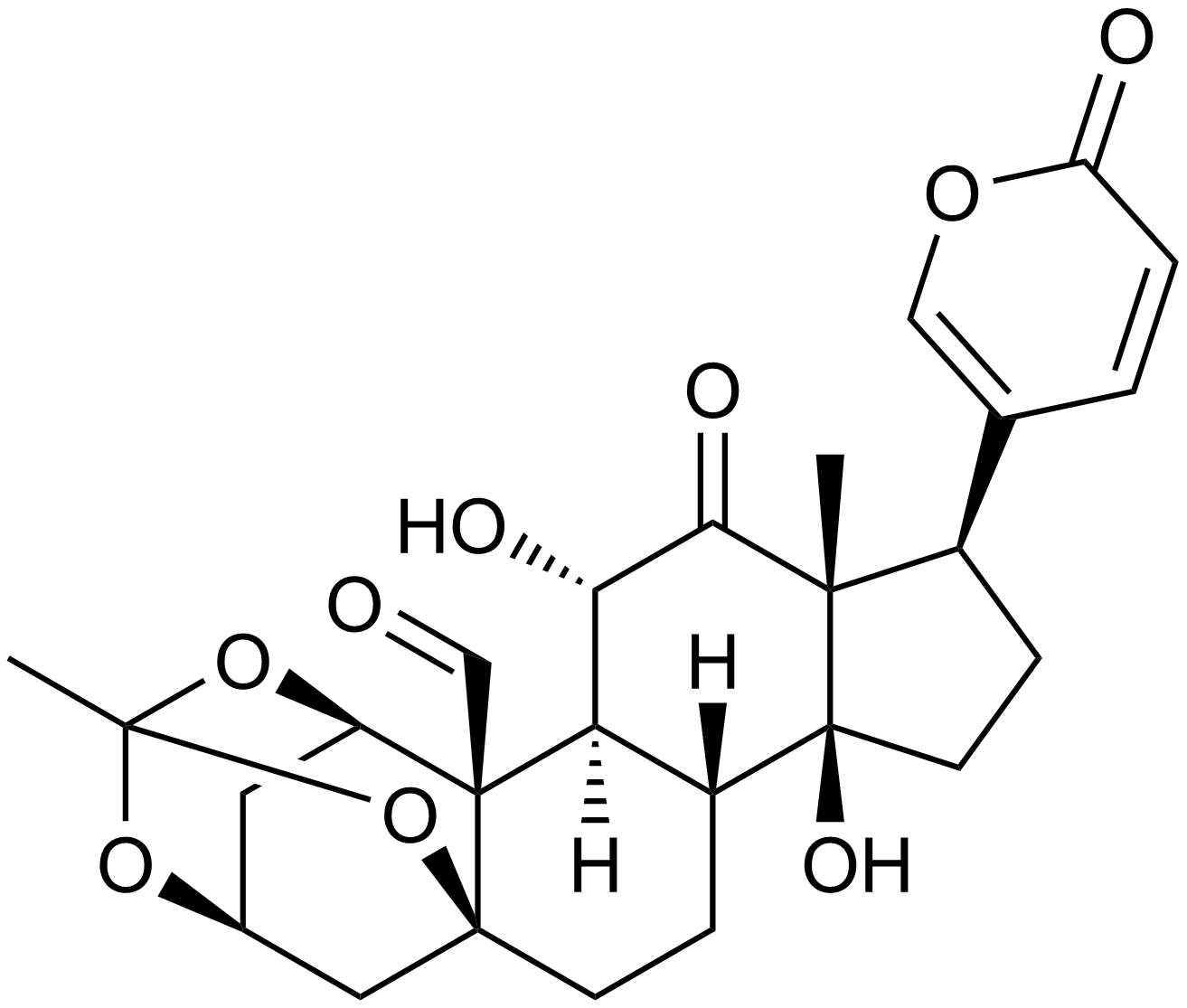

Names
- IUPAC name (1β,3β,5β,11α)-1,3,5-(ethylidynetris(oxy)-11,14-dihydroxy-12,19-dioxobufa-20,22-dienolide

Identifiers
CAS Number	98205-50-6
3D model (JSmol)	Interactive image; Interactive image
ChemSpider	112839
PubChem CID	127105
UNII	N5SG3A9FLM
CompTox Dashboard (EPA)	DTXSID40897532
- InChI: InChI=1S/C26H30O9/c1-22-15(13-3-4-18(28)32-11-13)6-8-26(22,31)16-5-7-24-10-14-9-17(34-23(2,33-14)35-24)25(24,12-27)19(16)20(29)21(22)30/h3-4,11-12,14-17,19-20,29,31H,5-10H2,1-2H3/t14-,15+,16+,17?,19+,20-,22-,23?,24?,25+,26-/m0/s1 Key: PHOLEJIIASOWOL-SQBSQXRJSA-N; InChI=1/C26H30O9/c1-22-15(13-3-4-18(28)32-11-13)6-8-26(22,31)16-5-7-24-10-14-9-17(34-23(2,33-14)35-24)25(24,12-27)19(16)20(29)21(22)30/h3-4,11-12,14-17,19-20,29,31H,5-10H2,1-2H3/t14-,15+,16+,17?,19+,20-,22-,23?,24?,25+,26-/m0/s1 Key: PHOLEJIIASOWOL-SQBSQXRJBB
- SMILES: C[C@@]12[C@@](CC[C@@H]2C(C=C3)=COC3=O)(O)[C@]4([H])CC[C@]5(OC6(C)O7)C[C@@H]7C[C@@H](O6)[C@]5(C=O)[C@@]4([H])[C@H](O)C1=O; O=C\1O\C=C(/C=C/1)[C@@H]6[C@]5(C(=O)[C@@H](O)[C@@H]7[C@]3(C=O)C4(OC2(O[C@@H](CC3O2)C4)C)CC[C@H]7[C@@]5(O)CC6)C

Properties
Chemical formula	C_{26}H_{30}O_{9}
Molar mass	486.517 g·mol^{−1}
Density	1.49 g/mL
Boiling point	695.2 °C (1,283.4 °F; 968.4 K)
- Except where otherwise noted, data are given for materials in their standard state (at 25 °C [77 °F], 100 kPa). verify (what is ?) Infobox references

Daigremontianin is a bufadienolide. Bufadienolides are steroids and cardiac glycoside aglycones (meaning that they bind with carbohydrates to form cardiac glycosides) that are similar to cardenolides, differing only in the structure of the C-17 substituent on the D ring. This chemical has been found to be toxic in experiments on mice. It is one of five bufadienolides that have been isolated from Kalanchoe daigremontiana.

== Toxicity ==
Daigremontianin is notorious for causing potentially fatal cardiac arrhythmias, but repeated sub-lethal doses cause a condition called cotyledonosis, an intoxication affecting nervous and muscular systems of small animals, particularly, sheep in the Karoo area of South Africa.
