= Scillarenin =

Bufadienolide steroidal aglycone

Names
- IUPAC name 5-[(3S,8R,9S,10R,13R,14S,17R)-3,14-Dihydroxy-10,13-dimethyl-1,2,3,6,7,8,9,11,12,15,16,17-dodecahydrocyclopenta[a]phenanthren-17-yl]pyran-2-one
- Other names: beta-Scillarenin; Cardiogenin; Scillarenin A

Identifiers
CAS Number	465-22-5
3D model (JSmol)	Interactive image
ChEBI	CHEBI:38248
ChemSpider	16736018
PubChem CID	12315393
UNII	XIA96RSL6E
CompTox Dashboard (EPA)	DTXSID60878661
- InChI: InChI=1S/C24H32O4/c1-22-10-7-17(25)13-16(22)4-5-20-19(22)8-11-23(2)18(9-12-24(20,23)27)15-3-6-21(26)28-14-15/h3,6,13-14,17-20,25,27H,4-5,7-12H2,1-2H3/t17-,18+,19-,20+,22-,23+,24-/m0/s1 Key: OVUOVMIMOCJILI-KFZANIOBSA-N
- SMILES: C[C@]12CC[C@@H](C=C1CC[C@@H]3[C@@H]2CC[C@]4([C@@]3(CC[C@@H]4C5=COC(=O)C=C5)O)C)O

Properties
Chemical formula	C_{24}H_{32}O_{4}
Molar mass	384.516 g·mol^{−1}
- Except where otherwise noted, data are given for materials in their standard state (at 25 °C [77 °F], 100 kPa). Infobox references

Scillarenin is a steroidal aglycone belonging to the bufadienolide class of cardiac glycosides. It represents the non-sugar core of several naturally occurring cardiac glycosides found in plants such as Scilla and Drimia maritima.

== Chemistry and natural occurrence ==
Scillarenin is a steroid derivative with a cyclopenta[a]phenanthrene nucleus and a characteristic unsaturated lactone ring at the C-17 position, a defining feature of bufadienolides. It serves as the aglycone component released upon hydrolysis of glycosidic cardiac compounds, such as scillaren A.

The compound is not typically found in free form in plants but occurs as part of glycosidic cardiac toxins.

Scillarenin itself has comparatively low intrinsic biological activity, while its glycosylated derivatives act as potent inhibitors of Na^{+}/K^{+}-ATPase, producing cardiotonic and toxic effects. These properties are characteristic of bufadienolide cardiac glycosides rather than the free aglycone.
