= Neoconvalloside =

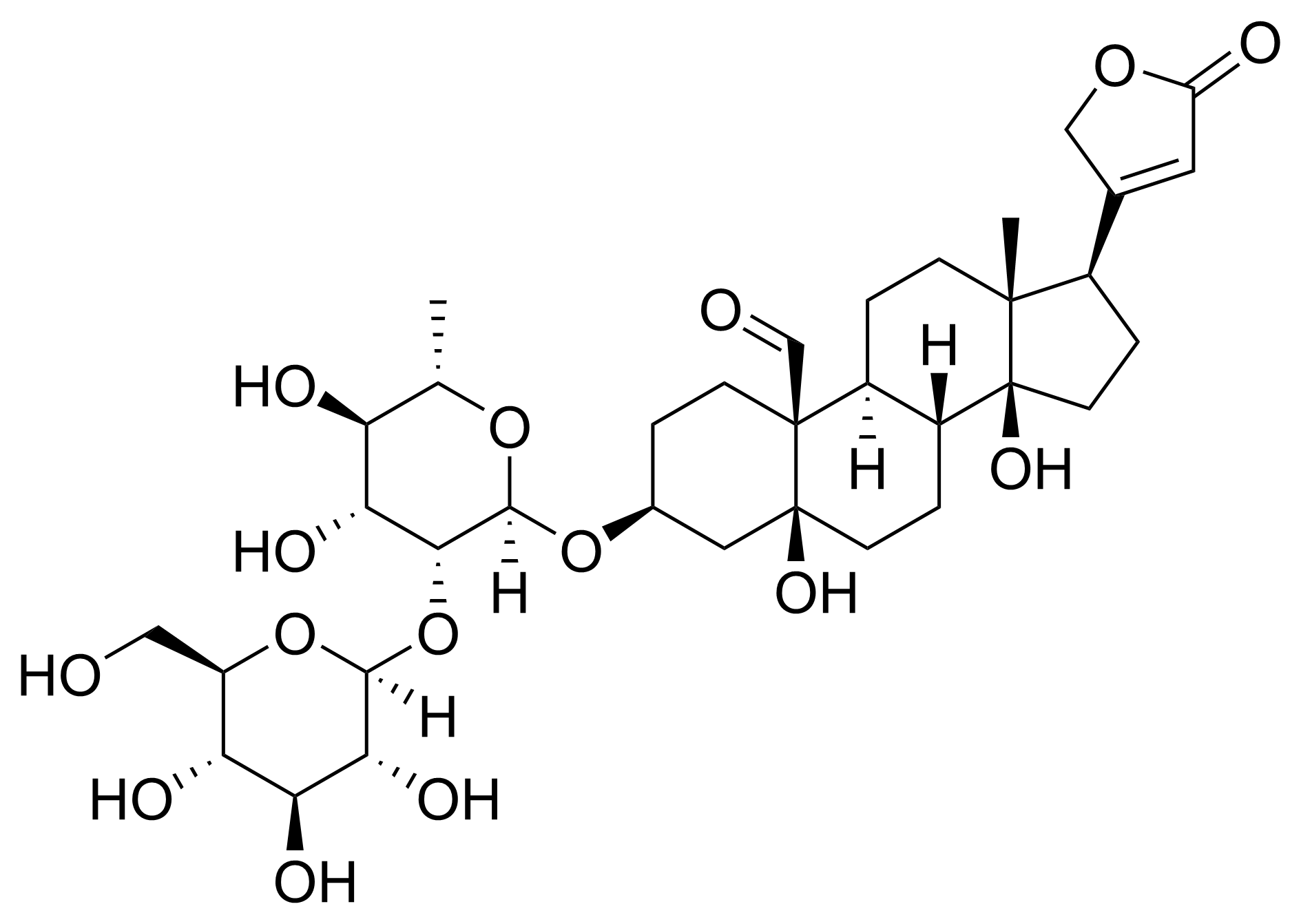

Names
- IUPAC name 3β-[β-D-Glucopyranosyl-(1→2)-α-L-rhamnopyranosyloxy]-5,14-dihydroxy-19-oxo-5β-card-20-enolide
- Systematic IUPAC name (1R,3aS,3bR,5aS,7S,9aS,9bS,11aR)-7-{[(2R,3R,4R,5R,6S)-4,5-Dihydroxy-6-methyl-3-{[(2S,3R,4S,5S,6R)-3,4,5-trihydroxy-6-(hydroxymethyl)oxan-2-yl]oxy}oxan-2-yl]oxy}-3a,5a-dihydroxy-11a-methyl-1-(5-oxo-2,5-dihydrofuran-3-yl)hexadecahydro-9aH-cyclopenta[a]phenanthrene-9a-carbaldehyde
- Other names Strophanthidin 3-O-[β-D-glucopyranosyl-(1→2)-α-L-rhamnopyranoside]

Identifiers
CAS Number	83841-55-8
3D model (JSmol)	Interactive image
ChemSpider	26559504
PubChem CID	57459383
CompTox Dashboard (EPA)	DTXSID10726663
- InChI: InChI=1S/C34H50O16/c1-31-6-3-18-19(34(31,45)9-5-17(31)15-10-21(37)46-13-15)4-8-33(44)11-16(2-7-32(18,33)14-36)47-30-27(24(40)25(41)28(43)50-30)49-29-26(42)23(39)22(38)20(12-35)48-29/h10,14,16-20,22-30,35,38-45H,2-9,11-13H2,1H3/t16-,17+,18-,19+,20+,22+,23-,24+,25+,26+,27+,28+,29-,30+,31+,32-,33-,34-/m0/s1 Key: QSARNYKHEUTBNG-MTHYCTICSA-N; InChI=1/C34H50O16/c1-31-6-3-18-19(34(31,45)9-5-17(31)15-10-21(37)46-13-15)4-8-33(44)11-16(2-7-32(18,33)14-36)47-30-27(24(40)25(41)28(43)50-30)49-29-26(42)23(39)22(38)20(12-35)48-29/h10,14,16-20,22-30,35,38-45H,2-9,11-13H2,1H3/t16-,17+,18-,19+,20+,22+,23-,24+,25+,26+,27+,28+,29-,30+,31+,32-,33-,34-/m0/s1 Key: QSARNYKHEUTBNG-MTHYCTICBT
- SMILES: C[C@@]12[C@@](CC[C@@H]2C3=CC(OC3)=O)(O)[C@]4([H])CC[C@]5(O)C[C@@H](O[C@]6([H])O[C@@H](O)[C@H](O)[C@@H](O)[C@H]6O[C@]7([H])O[C@H](CO)[C@@H](O)[C@H](O)[C@H]7O)CC[C@]5(C=O)[C@@]4([H])CC1

Properties
Chemical formula	C_{34}H_{50}O_{16}
Molar mass	714.758 g·mol^{−1}
Melting point	162 to 170 °C (324 to 338 °F; 435 to 443 K)
- Except where otherwise noted, data are given for materials in their standard state (at 25 °C [77 °F], 100 kPa). verify (what is ?) Infobox references

Neoconvalloside is a cardenolide glycoside extracted from Convallaria majalis.
