= Scilliroside =

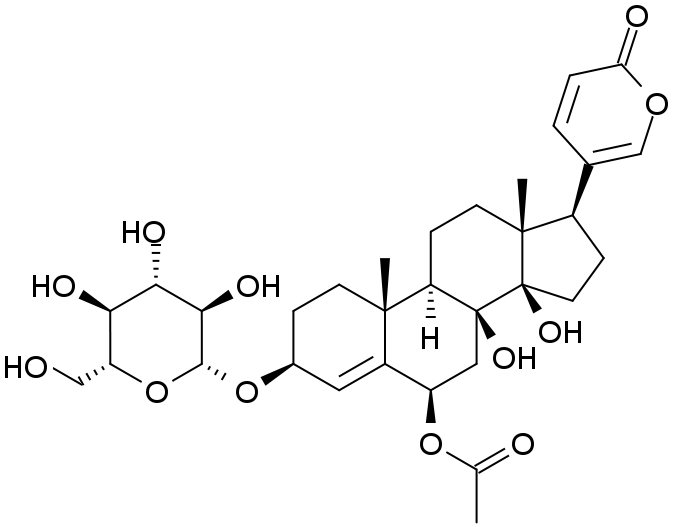

Names
- IUPAC name 6β-(Acetyloxy)-3β-(β-D-glucopyranosyloxy)-8,14-dihydroxybufa-4,20,22-trienolide
- Systematic IUPAC name (1R,3aR,3bS,5R,7S,9aR,9bR,11aR)-3a,3b-Dihydroxy-9a,11a-dimethyl-1-(2-oxo-2H-pyran-5-yl)-7-{[(2R,3R,4S,5S,6R)-3,4,5-trihydroxy-6-(hydroxymethyl)oxan-2-yl]oxy}-2,3,3a,3b,4,5,7,8,9,9a,9b,10,11,11a-tetradecahydro-1H-cyclopenta[a]phenanthren-5-yl acetate
- Other names (3β,6β)-6-(Acetyloxy)-3-(β-D-glucopyranosyloxy)-8,14-dihydroxybufa-4,20,22-trienolide

Identifiers
| CAS Number | 507-60-8 |
| 3D model (JSmol) | Interactive image |
| ChEBI | CHEBI:28332 |
| ChemSpider | 390447 |
| ECHA InfoCard | 100.007.344 |
| KEGG | C08880 |
| PubChem CID | 441871 |
| UNII | 2815004NHO |
| CompTox Dashboard (EPA) | DTXSID5042374 |
- InChI: InChI=1S/C32H44O12/c1-16(34)42-21-13-31(39)23(8-10-30(3)19(7-11-32(30,31)40)17-4-5-24(35)41-15-17)29(2)9-6-18(12-20(21)29)43-28-27(38)26(37)25(36)22(14-33)44-28/h4-5,12,15,18-19,21-23,25-28,33,36-40H,6-11,13-14H2,1-3H3/t18-,19+,21+,22+,23+,25+,26-,27+,28+,29-,30+,31-,32+/m0/s1 Key: LSMIOFMZNVEEBR-ICLSSMQGSA-N; InChI=1/C32H44O12/c1-16(34)42-21-13-31(39)23(8-10-30(3)19(7-11-32(30,31)40)17-4-5-24(35)41-15-17)29(2)9-6-18(12-20(21)29)43-28-27(38)26(37)25(36)22(14-33)44-28/h4-5,12,15,18-19,21-23,25-28,33,36-40H,6-11,13-14H2,1-3H3/t18-,19+,21+,22+,23+,25+,26-,27+,28+,29-,30+,31-,32+/m0/s1 Key: LSMIOFMZNVEEBR-ICLSSMQGBS
- SMILES: CC(=O)O[C@@H]1C[C@@]2([C@H](CC[C@]3([C@@]2(CC[C@@H]3c4ccc(=O)oc4)O)C)[C@@]5(C1=C[C@H](CC5)O[C@H]6[C@@H]([C@H]([C@@H]([C@H](O6)CO)O)O)O)C)O

Properties
| Chemical formula | C_{32}H_{44}O_{12} |
| Molar mass | 620.685 |

Hazards
- Occupational safety and health (OHS/OSH)
| Main hazards | Toxic |
- Except where otherwise noted, data are given for materials in their standard state (at 25 °C [77 °F], 100 kPa). verify (what is ?) Infobox references

Scilliroside is a toxic compound derived from the plant Drimia maritima (syn. Urginea maritima), which is sometimes used as a rodenticide.
