= ATP1A4 =

Protein-coding gene in humans

Identifiers
- Aliases: ATP1A4, ATP1A1, ATP1AL2, ATPase Na+/K+ transporting subunit alpha 4
- External IDs: OMIM: 607321; MGI: 1351335; GeneCards: ATP1A4
Enzyme activity
EC #	BRENDA	ExPASy	KEGG	MetaCyc
7.2.2.13	↗	↗	↗	↗

Gene location (Human)
Chr.	Chromosome 1 (human)
Band	1q23.2	Start	160,151,586 bp
Band	1q23.2	End	160,186,980 bp

Gene location (Mouse)
Chr.	Chromosome 1 (mouse)
Band	1 H3|1 79.54 cM	Start	172,051,080 bp
Band	1 H3|1 79.54 cM	End	172,085,981 bp
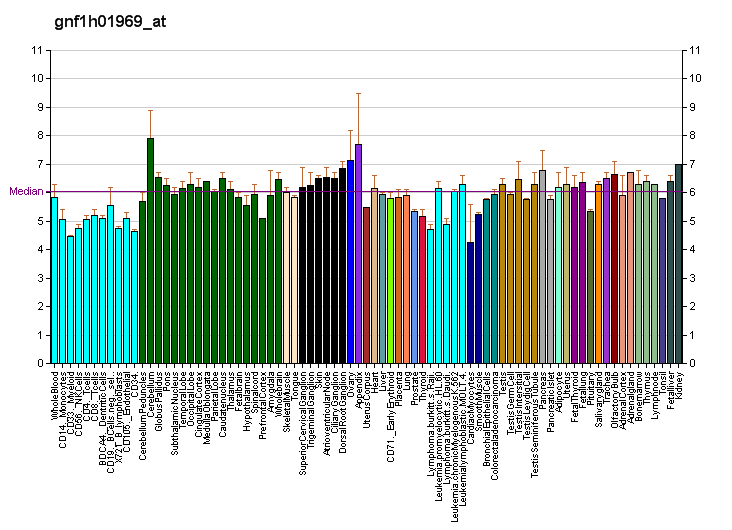
RNA expression pattern
Bgee	Human / Mouse (ortholog); Top expressed in: left testis; right testis; testicle; sperm; seminal vesicula; gastrocnemius muscle; urinary bladder; muscle of thigh; gonad; lymph node / Top expressed in: seminiferous tubule; spermatid; spermatocyte; embryo; zygote; muscle of thigh; skeletal muscle tissue; subcutaneous adipose tissue; white adipose tissue; temporal muscle; More reference expression data
BioGPS	More reference expression data
Gene ontology
Molecular function	nucleotide binding; P-type sodium:potassium-exchanging transporter activity; metal ion binding; hydrolase activity; ATP binding; P-type potassium transmembrane transporter activity
Cellular component	integral component of membrane; membrane; plasma membrane; integral component of plasma membrane; sodium:potassium-exchanging ATPase complex
Biological process	flagellated sperm motility; establishment or maintenance of transmembrane electrochemical gradient; sodium ion transport; regulation of membrane potential; ion transport; potassium ion transport; regulation of cellular pH; spermatogenesis; fertilization; cellular sodium ion homeostasis; cellular potassium ion homeostasis; sodium ion export across plasma membrane; potassium ion import across plasma membrane; ion transmembrane transport; regulation of cardiac conduction
Sources:Amigo / QuickGO
Orthologs
Databases	NCBI: entry; OMA: entry
Species	Human	Mouse
Entrez	480	27222
Ensembl	ENSG00000132681	ENSMUSG00000007107
UniProt	Q13733	Q9WV27
RefSeq (mRNA)	NM_001001734; NM_144699	NM_013734
RefSeq (protein)	NP_001001734; NP_653300	NP_038762
Location (UCSC)	Chr 1: 160.15 – 160.19 Mb	Chr 1: 172.05 – 172.09 Mb
PubMed search
- Wikidata
View/Edit Human	View/Edit Mouse

Sodium/potassium-transporting ATPase subunit alpha-4 is an enzyme that in humans is encoded by the ATP1A4 gene.

The protein encoded by this gene belongs to the family of P-type cation transport ATPases, and to the subfamily of Na+/K+ -ATPases. Na+/K+ -ATPase is an integral membrane protein responsible for establishing and maintaining the electrochemical gradients of Na and K ions across the plasma membrane. These gradients are essential for osmoregulation, for sodium-coupled transport of a variety of organic and inorganic molecules, and for electrical excitability of nerve and muscle. This enzyme is composed of two subunits, a large catalytic subunit (alpha) and a smaller glycoprotein subunit (beta). The catalytic subunit of Na+/K+ -ATPase is encoded by multiple genes. This gene encodes an alpha 4 subunit. Alternatively spliced transcript variants encoding different isoforms have been identified.
