= Inositol-hexakisphosphate kinase =

Class of enzymes

Identifiers
- EC no.: 2.7.4.21
- CAS no.: 176898-37-6

Databases
- BRENDA: enzyme data
- ExPASy: NiceZyme view
- KEGG: enzyme entry
- MetaCyc: metabolic pathway
- Rhea: reactions
- PDB structures: RCSB PDB PDBe PDBsum
Search
- PMC: articles
- PubMed: articles
- NCBI: proteins

Inositol-hexakisphosphate kinase (EC 2.7.4.21, ATP:1D-myo-inositol-hexakisphosphate phosphotransferase) is an enzyme with systematic name ATP:1D-myo-inositol-hexakisphosphate 5-phosphotransferase. This enzyme catalyses the following chemical reaction

(1) ATP + 1D-myo-inositol hexakisphosphate(Phytic acid) $\rightleftharpoons$ ADP + 1D-myo-inositol 5-diphosphate 1,2,3,4,6-pentakisphosphate
(2) ATP + 1D-myo-inositol 1,3,4,5,6-pentakisphosphate $\rightleftharpoons$ ADP + 1D-myo-inositol diphosphate tetrakisphosphate (isomeric configuration unknown)

Three mammalian isoforms are known to exist.

== See also ==
- IP6K1
- IP6K2
