= Digitoxigenin =

Names
- IUPAC name 3β,14-Dihydroxy-5β-card-20(22)-enolide
- Systematic IUPAC name 4-[(1R,3aS,3bR,5aR,7S,9aS,9bS,11aR)-5a,7-Dihydroxy-9a,11a-dimethylhexadecahydro-1H-cyclopenta[a]phenanthren-1-yl]furan-2(5H)-one
- Other names 3-β,14-dihydroxy-5-β,14-β-card-20(22)-enolide 5β-Card-20(22)-enolide, 3β,14-dihydroxy- Card-20(22)-enolide, 3,14-dihydroxy-, (3β,5β)- NSC 407806; Δ20:22-3,14,21-Trihydroxynorcholenic acid lactone cerberigenin echujetin evonogenin thevetigenin

Identifiers
CAS Number	143-62-4
3D model (JSmol)	Interactive image
Beilstein Reference	95448
ChEMBL	ChEMBL1453
ChemSpider	3571902
ECHA InfoCard	100.005.095
EC Number	205-603-4
PubChem CID	4369270
RTECS number	FH4975000
UNII	S63WOD4VOL
CompTox Dashboard (EPA)	DTXSID80162276
- InChI: InChI=1S/C23H34O4/c1-21-8-5-16(24)12-15(21)3-4-19-18(21)6-9-22(2)17(7-10-23(19,22)26)14-11-20(25)27-13-14/h11,15-19,24,26H,3-10,12-13H2,1-2H3/t15-,16+,17-,18+,19-,21+,22-,23+/m1/s1 Key: XZTUSOXSLKTKJQ-CESUGQOBSA-N; InChI=1/C23H34O4/c1-21-8-5-16(24)12-15(21)3-4-19-18(21)6-9-22(2)17(7-10-23(19,22)26)14-11-20(25)27-13-14/h11,15-19,24,26H,3-10,12-13H2,1-2H3/t15-,16+,17-,18+,19-,21+,22-,23+/m1/s1 Key: XZTUSOXSLKTKJQ-CESUGQOBBG
- SMILES: O=C/1OCC(=C\1)\[C@@H]2[C@@]4([C@](O)(CC2)[C@@H]5CC[C@@H]3C[C@@H](O)CC[C@]3(C)[C@H]5CC4)C

Properties
Chemical formula	C_{23}H_{34}O_{4}
Molar mass	374.51
Appearance	solid
Melting point	252 to 253 °C (486 to 487 °F; 525 to 526 K)

Hazards
- Occupational safety and health (OHS/OSH)
Main hazards	Toxic
- Except where otherwise noted, data are given for materials in their standard state (at 25 °C [77 °F], 100 kPa). Infobox references

Digitoxigenin, a cardenolide, is the aglycone of digitoxin.

Digitoxigenin can be used to prepare actodigin.

In Lednicer's book on steroids, it is made from deoxycholic acid.
