= Cardenolide =

Names
- IUPAC name 3-[(8R,9S,10S,13S,14R,17S)-10,13-dimethyl-2,3,4,5,6,7,8,9,11,12,14,15,16,17-tetradecahydro-1H-cyclopenta[a]phenanthren-17-yl]-2H-furan-5-one

Identifiers
CAS Number	52085-71-9
3D model (JSmol)	Interactive image; Interactive image
ChemSpider	19954501
PubChem CID	53957771
UNII	L54QGD9LPW
CompTox Dashboard (EPA)	DTXSID40952054
- InChI: InChI=1S/C23H34O 2/c1-22-11-4-3-5-16(22)6-7-17-19-9-8-18(15-13-21(24)25-14-15)23(19,2)12-10-20(17)22/h4,11,15-20H,3,5-10,12-14H2,1-2H3/t15-,16?,17-,18+,19+,20-,22-,23+/m0/s1 Key: NMLOFHCUVXKTGV-OCYOQFCJSA-N; InChI=1/C23H34O2/c1-22-11-4-3-5-16(22)6-7-17-19-9-8-18(15-13-21(24)25-14-15)23(19,2)12-10-20(17)22/h4,11,15-20H,3,5-10,12-14H2,1-2H3/t15-,16?,17-,18+,19+,20-,22-,23+/m0/s1 Key: NMLOFHCUVXKTGV-OCYOQFCJBM
- SMILES: CC12CCCCC1CCC3C2CCC4(C3C=CC4C5CC(=O)OC5)C; C[C@]52/C=C\CCC5CC[C@H]1[C@H]3CC[C@@H]([C@@]3(C)CC[C@@H]12)[C@H]4CC(=O)OC4

Properties
Chemical formula	C_{23}H_{34}O_{2}
Molar mass	342.51486
- Except where otherwise noted, data are given for materials in their standard state (at 25 °C [77 °F], 100 kPa). verify (what is ?) Infobox references

A cardenolide is a type of steroid. Many plants contain derivatives, collectively known as cardenolides, including many in the form of cardenolide glycosides (cardenolides that contain structural groups derived from sugars). Cardenolide glycosides are often toxic; specifically, they are heart-arresting. Cardenolides are toxic to animals through inhibition of the enzyme Na^{+}/K^{+}-ATPase, which is responsible for maintaining the sodium and potassium ion gradients across the cell membranes.

== Etymology ==
The term derives from card- "heart" (from Greek καρδία kardiā) and the suffix -enolide, referring to the lactone ring with double bond at C17. Cardenolides are a class of steroids (or aglycones if viewed as cardiac glycoside constituents), and cardenolides are a subtype of this class (see MeSH D codes list).

== Structure ==
Cardenolides are C(23)-steroids with methyl groups at C-10 and C-13 and a five-membered lactone (specifically a butenolide) at C-17. They are aglycone constituents of cardiac glycosides and must have at least one double bond in the molecule. The class includes cardadienolides and cardatrienolides. Members include:

- acetyldigitoxins
- acetyldigoxins
- cymarine
- digitoxin
- digitoxigenin
- digoxigenin
- digoxin
- medigoxin
- neoconvalloside
- ouabain
- strophanthidin

Bufadienolide and marinobufagenin are similar in structure and function.

Cardanolide is the same core structure, but has a saturated lactone ring instead of one containing an alkene.

== As defense mechanism ==
Some plant and animal species use cardenolides as defense mechanisms, notably the milkweed butterflies. Species such as the monarch, queen, and plain tiger ingest the cardenolides contained in the milkweeds (Asclepias) that they mostly feed on and sequester as larvae for defense as adults. The cardenolide content in butterflies deters most vertebrate predators, except a few which have evolved to become cardenolide-tolerant, such as the black-backed orioles (Icterus abeillei Lesson) and black-headed grosbeaks (Pheucticus melanocephalus Swainson) that account for 60% of monarch butterfly mortalities in the overwintering sites in central Mexico. In addition to milkweeds and other members of the Apocynaceae, plants in at least 12 botanical families have convergently evolved cardenolides, used as a chemical defense mechanism against herbivores. Herbivorous insects in six different orders have evolved resistance to the toxic effects of cardenolides in the food sources that they use. These cardenolide-resistant insect species convergently evolved this resistance through similar amino-acid substitutions in the alpha subunit of the enzyme Na^{+}/K^{+}-ATPase.
