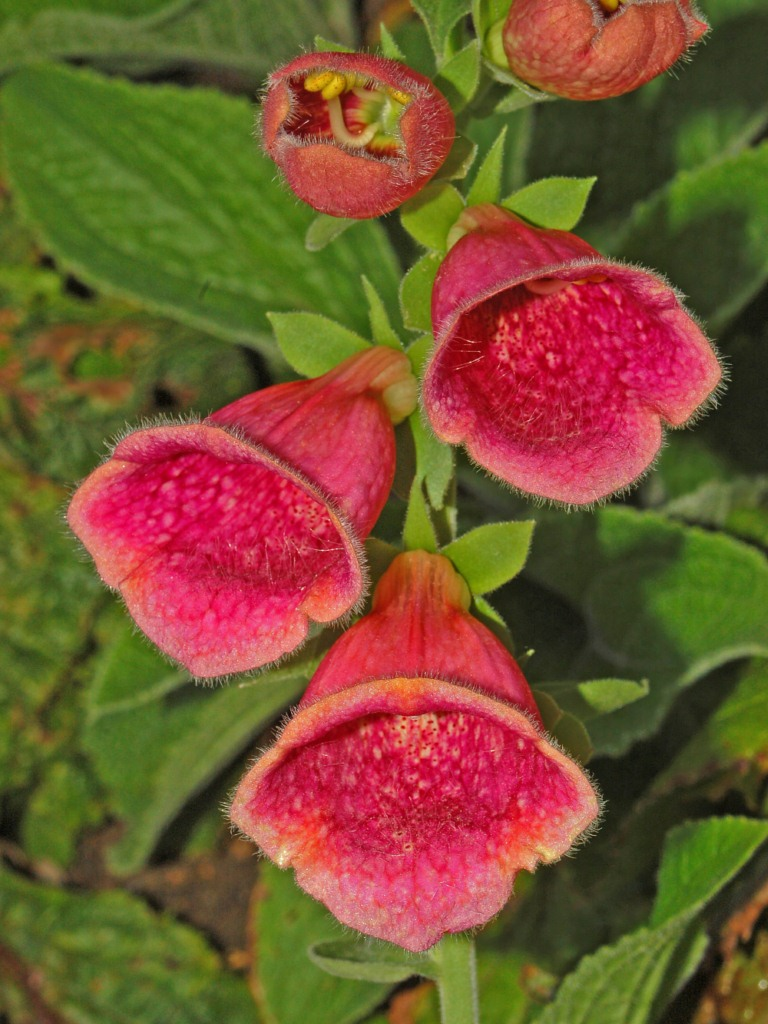

Scientific classification
- Kingdom: Plantae
- Clade: Tracheophytes
- Clade: Angiosperms
- Clade: Eudicots
- Clade: Asterids
- Order: Lamiales
- Family: Plantaginaceae
- Genus: Digitalis
- Species: D. × fulva

Binomial name
- Digitalis × fulva Lindl.

Synonyms
- List: Digitalis × mertonensis Buxton & J.Darl.

= Digitalis × fulva =

Hybrid species of flowering plant

Digitalis × fulva, the strawberry foxglove, is a hybrid species of flowering plant within the family Plantaginaceae. It is a naturally occurring fertile hybrid between the species Digitalis grandiflora and Digitalis purpurea. The species is widely marketed in the UK under the common name of strawberry foxglove or its taxonomic synonym Digitalis × mertonensis. The species has been used to produce various cultivars and has gained the Royal Horticultural Society's Award of Garden Merit.

== Description ==
This perennial herbaceous plant reaches an average a height of 60–90 centimetres (24–35 in). The erect stems rise from a semi-evergreen basal rosette of soft leaves. It has typical tall spikes of large tubular flowers. The colour ranges from strawberry pink (hence the common name) to mauve. The flowering period extends from late spring to early summer. It prefers neutral or mildly acidic substrate and rich, moist and regularly watered soil, in full sun or in partial shade.

== Distribution and habitat ==
Digitalis × fulva has a native distribution within Central Europe, where it can be found naturally occurring in countries such as Austria and Germany. This hybrid species has also expanded its range after being introduced into Great Britain.
