= IP6K2 =

Protein-coding gene in the species Homo sapiens

Identifiers
- Aliases: IP6K2, IHPK2, PIUS, inositol hexakisphosphate kinase 2, InsP6K2
- External IDs: OMIM: 606992; MGI: 1923750; GeneCards: IP6K2

Gene location (Human)
Chr.	Chromosome 3 (human)
Band	3p21.31	Start	48,688,003 bp
Band	3p21.31	End	48,740,353 bp
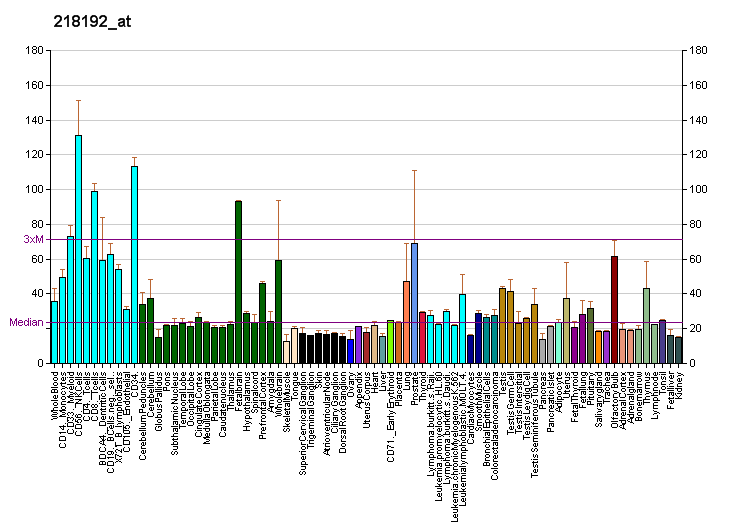
RNA expression pattern
Bgee	Human / Mouse (ortholog); Top expressed in: right hemisphere of cerebellum; ganglionic eminence; tibial nerve; skin of abdomen; skin of leg; right uterine tube; mucosa of transverse colon; body of uterus; anterior pituitary; left ovary / n/a; More reference expression data
BioGPS	More reference expression data
Gene ontology
Molecular function	kinase activity; inositol hexakisphosphate 5-kinase activity; transferase activity; inositol hexakisphosphate 1-kinase activity; nucleotide binding; protein binding; ATP binding; inositol hexakisphosphate 3-kinase activity; inositol-1,3,4,5,6-pentakisphosphate kinase activity; inositol 5-diphosphate pentakisphosphate 5-kinase activity; inositol diphosphate tetrakisphosphate kinase activity; inositol heptakisphosphate kinase activity; inositol hexakisphosphate kinase activity; flavonoid binding
Cellular component	nucleus; nucleoplasm; fibrillar center; cell junction; intermediate filament cytoskeleton
Biological process	phosphate ion transport; phosphatidylinositol phosphate biosynthetic process; inositol phosphate metabolic process; type I interferon signaling pathway; negative regulation of cell growth; phosphorylation; positive regulation of apoptotic process; inositol phosphate biosynthetic process; cellular response to flavonoid; lipid metabolism; phosphatidylinositol metabolic process
Sources:Amigo / QuickGO
Orthologs
Databases	NCBI: entry; OMA: entry
Species	Human	Mouse
Entrez	51447	76500
Ensembl	ENSG00000068745	ENSMUSG00000032599
UniProt	Q9UHH9	Q80V72
RefSeq (mRNA)	NM_001005909; NM_001005910; NM_001005911; NM_001005912; NM_001005913 NM_001146178; NM_001146179; NM_001190316; NM_001190317; NM_016291	NM_029634
RefSeq (protein)	NP_001005909; NP_001005910; NP_001005911; NP_001139650; NP_001139651 NP_001177245; NP_001177246; NP_057375	NP_083910; NP_001366529; NP_001366530; NP_001366531; NP_001366532
Location (UCSC)	Chr 3: 48.69 – 48.74 Mb	n/a
PubMed search
- Wikidata
View/Edit Human	View/Edit Mouse

Inositol hexakisphosphate kinase 2 is an enzyme that in humans is encoded by the IP6K2 gene.

This gene encodes a protein that belongs to the inositol phosphokinase (IPK) family. This protein is likely responsible for the conversion of inositol hexakisphosphate (InsP6) to diphosphoinositol pentakisphosphate (InsP7/PP-InsP5). It may also convert 1,3,4,5,6-pentakisphosphate (InsP5) to PP-InsP4 and affect the growth suppressive and apoptotic activities of interferon-beta in some ovarian cancers. Alternative splicing results in multiple transcript variants encoding different isoforms.

== See also ==
- Inositol-hexakisphosphate kinase
