= Proscillaridin =

Chemical compound

Clinical data
- Other names: 14β-Hydroxy-3β-[α-L-rhamnopyranosyl)oxy]bufa-4,20,22-trienolide
- AHFS/Drugs.com: International Drug Names
- ATC code: C01AB01 (WHO)

Identifiers
- IUPAC name: 5-[(3S,8R,9S,10R,13R,14S,17R)-14-Hydroxy- 10,13-dimethyl-3-((2R,3R,4R,5R,6R)-3,4,5-trihydroxy- 6-methyltetrahydro-2H-pyran-2-yloxy)-2,3,6,7,8,9,10,11,12,13,14,15,16,17-tetradecahydro- 1H-cyclopenta[a]phenanthren-17-yl]-2H-pyran-2-one
- CAS Number: 466-06-8
- PubChem CID: 5284613
- ChemSpider: 4447658
- UNII: KC6BL281EN
- ChEMBL: ChEMBL600325
- CompTox Dashboard (EPA): DTXSID5023532
- ECHA InfoCard: 100.006.702

Chemical and physical data
- Formula: C_{30}H_{42}O_{8}
- Molar mass: 530.658 g·mol^{−1}
- 3D model (JSmol): Interactive image
- SMILES: O=C1OC=C([C@H]2CC[C@]3([C@@]2(CC[C@H]4[C@H]3CCC5=C[C@H](CC[C@@]54C)O[C@@H]6O[C@@H](C)[C@@H]([C@H]([C@H]6O)O)O)C)O)C=C1
- InChI: InChI=1S/C30H42O8/c1-16-24(32)25(33)26(34)27(37-16)38-19-8-11-28(2)18(14-19)5-6-22-21(28)9-12-29(3)20(10-13-30(22,29)35)17-4-7-23(31)36-15-17/h4,7,14-16,19-22,24-27,32-35H,5-6,8-13H2,1-3H3/t16-,19-,20+,21-,22+,24-,25+,26+,27-,28-,29+,30-/m0/s1; Key:MYEJFUXQJGHEQK-ALRJYLEOSA-N

Proscillaridin is a cardiac glycoside, a type of compound with strong and usually toxic effects on heart muscle, with occasional medical applications - although Proscillaridin has no known medical applications. It is of the bufanolide type and can be obtained from plants of the genus Scilla and in Drimia maritima (Scilla maritima).

The aglycone of proscillaridin is scillarenin.
