= Digitoxin =

Chemical compound

Clinical data
- Trade names: Digalen, Digitaline, Digitmerck, others
- Routes of administration: By mouth, Intravenous injection
- ATC code: C01AA04 (WHO)

Legal status
- Legal status: In general: ℞ (Prescription only)

Pharmacokinetic data
- Bioavailability: 98–100% (oral)
- Protein binding: 90–97%
- Metabolism: Liver (CYP3A4)
- Elimination half-life: 7–8 days
- Excretion: 60% via urine, 40% via faeces

Identifiers
- IUPAC name: (3β,5β)-3-[(O-2,6-dideoxy- β-D-ribo-hexapyranosyl-(1->4)- 2,6-dideoxy-β-D-ribo-hexopyranosyl)oxy]- 14-hydroxycard-20(22)-enolide
- CAS Number: 71-63-6
- PubChem CID: 441207
- IUPHAR/BPS: 6782
- DrugBank: DB01396
- ChemSpider: 389987
- UNII: E90NZP2L9U
- KEGG: D00297
- ChEBI: CHEBI:28544
- ChEMBL: ChEMBL254219
- CompTox Dashboard (EPA): DTXSID0022933
- ECHA InfoCard: 100.000.691

Chemical and physical data
- Formula: C_{41}H_{64}O_{13}
- Molar mass: 764.950 g·mol^{−1}
- 3D model (JSmol): Interactive image
- SMILES: O=C\1OC/C(=C/1)[C@H]2CC[C@@]8(O)[C@]2(C)CC[C@H]7[C@H]8CC[C@H]6[C@]7(C)CC[C@H](O[C@@H]5O[C@H](C)[C@@H](O[C@@H]4O[C@@H]([C@@H](O[C@@H]3O[C@@H]([C@@H](O)[C@@H](O)C3)C)[C@@H](O)C4)C)[C@@H](O)C5)C6
- InChI: InChI=1S/C41H64O13/c1-20-36(46)29(42)16-34(49-20)53-38-22(3)51-35(18-31(38)44)54-37-21(2)50-33(17-30(37)43)52-25-8-11-39(4)24(15-25)6-7-28-27(39)9-12-40(5)26(10-13-41(28,40)47)23-14-32(45)48-19-23/h14,20-22,24-31,33-38,42-44,46-47H,6-13,15-19H2,1-5H3/t20-,21-,22-,24-,25+,26-,27+,28-,29+,30+,31+,33+,34+,35+,36-,37-,38-,39+,40-,41+/m1/s1; Key:WDJUZGPOPHTGOT-XUDUSOBPSA-N

Digitoxin is a cardiac glycoside used for the treatment of heart failure and certain kinds of heart arrhythmia. It is a phytosteroid and is similar in structure and effects to digoxin, though the effects are longer-lasting. Unlike digoxin, which is eliminated from the body via the kidneys, it is eliminated via the liver, and so can be used in patients with poor or erratic kidney function. While several controlled trials have shown digoxin to be effective in a proportion of patients treated for heart failure, the evidence base for digitoxin is not as strong, although it is presumed to be similarly effective.

== Medical uses ==
Digitoxin is used for the treatment of heart failure, especially in people with impaired kidney function. It is also used to treat certain kinds of heart arrhythmia, such as atrial fibrillation.

== Contraindications ==
Contraindications include

- problems with the heart rhythm, such as severe bradycardia (slow heartbeat), ventricular tachycardia (fast heartbeat caused by the ventricles), ventricular fibrillation, or first- to second-degree atrioventricular block,
- and certain electrolyte imbalances: hypokalemia (low blood potassium levels), hypomagnesemia (low magnesium), and hypercalcemia (high calcium).

== Adverse effects and toxicity ==
Digitoxin exhibits similar toxic effects to digoxin, namely: anorexia, nausea, vomiting, diarrhea, confusion, visual disturbances, and cardiac arrhythmias. Antidigoxin antibody fragments, the specific treatment for digoxin poisoning, are also effective in serious digitoxin toxicity.

== Interactions ==
Drugs that can increase digitoxin toxicity include:

- calcium
- substances that lower potassium or magnesium levels, such as diuretics and corticosteroids
- inhibitors of the liver enzyme CYP3A4, which slow down digitoxin metabolism; examples are the antibiotic clarithromycin, the antifungal itraconazole, and grapefruit juice
- inhibitors of the transporter protein P-gp, such as clarithromycin
- Beta blockers add to the bradycardia (slow heartbeat) caused by digitoxin.

Drugs that can decrease the effectivity of digitoxin include:

- substances that increase potassium levels, such as Potassium-sparing diuretics
- inducers of CYP3A4 or P-gp, such as phenytoin, rifampicin and St John's Wort
- substances that bind digitoxin in the gut, such as aluminium containing antacids or colestyramine

== Pharmacology ==
=== Mechanism of action ===
Digitoxin inhibits the sodium-potassium ATPase in heart muscle cells, resulting in increased force of contractions (positive inotropic), reduced speed of electric conduction (negative dromotropic), increased excitability (positive bathmotropic), and reduced frequency of heartbeat (negative chronotropic).

=== Pharmacokinetics ===
The drug is almost completely absorbed from the gut. When in the bloodstream, 90 to 97% are bound to plasma proteins. Digitoxin undergoes enterohepatic circulation. It is metabolized in part by CYP3A4; metabolites include digitoxigenin, digoxin (>2%), and conjugate esters. In healthy people, 60% are eliminated via the kidneys and 40% via the faeces. In people with impaired kidney function, elimination via the faeces is increased. The biological half-life is 7 to 8 days except when kidney and liver functions are impaired, in which case it is usually longer.

== History ==
The first description of the use of foxglove dates back to 1775. For quite some time, the active compound was not isolated. Oswald Schmiedeberg was able to obtain a pure sample in 1875. The modern therapeutic use of this molecule was made possible by the works of the pharmacist and the French chemist Claude-Adolphe Nativelle (1812–1889). The first structural analysis was done by Adolf Otto Reinhold Windaus in 1925, but the full structure with an exact determination of the sugar groups was not accomplished until 1962.

== Use as a weapon ==
Digitoxin has been used for at least 7,000 years as an arrow poison. Marie Alexandrine Becker, a Belgian serial killer, was sentenced to death for poisoning eleven people with digitoxin.

=== In fiction ===
Digitoxin is used as a poison or murder weapon in:

- Agatha Christie's Appointment with Death
- Elizabeth Peters' Die For Love
- CSI, season 9, episode 19: "The Descent of Man"
- Rosewood season 2, episode 20: Calliphoridae and Country Roads
- "Casino Royale" (2006)
- "Uneasy Lies the Crown" on Columbo, season 9, episode 5 (1990)
- "Affair of the Heart" on McMillan and Wife, season 6, episode 5 (1977)
- Murder 101: "College can be a Murder"
- Several episodes of Murder She Wrote.
- Private Practice, season 4, episode 18: "The Hardest Part"

In The Decemberists's song, "The Rake's Song" on The Hazards of Love album, the narrator murders his daughter by feeding her foxglove.

In Metal Gear Solid V: The Phantom Pain, Venom Snake uses digitalis to obtain digoxin for tranquilizer rounds to incapacitate enemies.

== Research ==
Digitoxin and related cardenolides display anticancer activity against a range of human cancer cell lines in vitro but the clinical use of digitoxin to treat cancer has been restricted by its narrow therapeutic index. Digitoxin glycorandomization led to the discovery of novel digitoxigenin neoglycosides which displayed improved anticancer potency and reduced inotropic activity (the perceived mechanism of general toxicity).
