= Cardanolide =

Names
- IUPAC name (4R)-4-[(8R,9S,10S,13S,14R,17R)-10,13-dimethyl-2,3,4,5,6,7,8,9,11,12,14,15,16,17-tetradecahydro-1H-cyclopenta[a]phenanthren-17-yl]-2-tetrahydrofuranone

Identifiers
| CAS Number | 4427-84-3 |
| 3D model (JSmol) | Interactive image; Interactive image |
| ChEBI | CHEBI:35543 |
| ChemSpider | 102889 |
| PubChem CID | 114951 |
| CompTox Dashboard (EPA) | DTXSID90276151 |
- InChI: InChI=1S/C23H36O2/c1-22-11-4-3-5-16(22)6-7-17-19-9-8-18(15-13-21(24)25-14-15)23(19,2)12-10-20(17)22/h15-20H,3-14H2,1-2H3/t15-,16?,17-,18+,19+,20-,22-,23+/m0/s1 Key: AQARKTASOBROAE-OCYOQFCJSA-N; InChI=1/C23H36O2/c1-22-11-4-3-5-16(22)6-7-17-19-9-8-18(15-13-21(24)25-14-15)23(19,2)12-10-20(17)22/h15-20H,3-14H2,1-2H3/t15-,16?,17-,18+,19+,20-,22-,23+/m0/s1 Key: AQARKTASOBROAE-OCYOQFCJBU
- SMILES: CC12CCCCC1CCC3C2CCC4(C3CCC4C5CC(=O)OC5)C; O=C5OC[C@@H]([C@@H]4[C@@]3([C@@H]([C@@H]2CCC1CCCC[C@]1(C)[C@H]2CC3)CC4)C)C5

Properties
| Chemical formula | C_{23}H_{36}O_{2} |
| Molar mass | 344.539 g·mol^{−1} |
| Density | 1.062 g/ml |
- Except where otherwise noted, data are given for materials in their standard state (at 25 °C [77 °F], 100 kPa). verify (what is ?) Infobox references

Cardanolide is a steroid with a molecular weight of 344.54 g/mol.

== See also ==
- Cardiac glycoside
