= Bufadienolide =

Names
- IUPAC name 5-[(5R, 8R,9S,10S,13S,14S,17S)-10,13-dimethyl-2,3,4,5,6,7,8,9,11,12,14,15,16,17-tetradecahydro-1H-cyclopenta[a]phenanthren-17-yl]pyran-2-one

Identifiers
CAS Number	29565-35-3
3D model (JSmol)	Interactive image
ChEBI	CHEBI:83977
ChemSpider	26286947
PubChem CID	3035030
CompTox Dashboard (EPA)	DTXSID70276154
- InChI: InChI=1S/C24H34O2/c1-23-13-4-3-5-17(23)7-8-18-20-10-9-19(16-6-11-22(25)26-15-16)24(20,2)14-12-21(18)23/h6,11,15,17-21H,3-5,7-10,12-14H2,1-2H3/t17-,18-,19+,20+,21-,23-,24+/m0/s1 Key: YBPMPRDOWHIVNA-JTSGVHQASA-N; InChI=1S/C24H34O2/c1-23-13-4-3-5-17(23)7-8-18-20-10-9-19(16-6-11-22(25)26-15-16)24(20,2)14-12-21(18)23/h6,11,15,17-21H,3-5,7-10,12-14H2,1-2H3/t17-,18-,19+,20+,21-,23-,24+/m0/s1 Key: YBPMPRDOWHIVNA-JTSGVHQASA-N
- SMILES: CC14CCC3C2(C)CCCCC2CCC3C1CCC4c5ccc(=O)oc5

Properties
Chemical formula	C_{24}H_{34}O_{2}
Molar mass	354.534 g·mol^{−1}
- Except where otherwise noted, data are given for materials in their standard state (at 25 °C [77 °F], 100 kPa). verify (what is ?) Infobox references

Bufadienolide is a chemical compound with steroid structure. Its derivatives are collectively known as bufadienolides, including many in the form of bufadienolide glycosides (bufadienolides that contain structural groups derived from sugars). These are a type of cardiac glycoside, the other being the cardenolide glycosides. Both bufadienolides and their glycosides are toxic; specifically, they can cause an atrioventricular block, bradycardia (slow heartbeat), ventricular tachycardia (a type of rapid heartbeat), and possibly lethal cardiac arrest.

== Etymology ==
The term derives from the toad genus Bufo that contains bufadienolide glycosides, the suffix -adien- that refers to the two double bonds in the lactone ring, and the ending -olide that denotes the lactone structure. Consequently, related structures with only one double bond are called bufenolides, and the saturated equivalent is bufanolide.

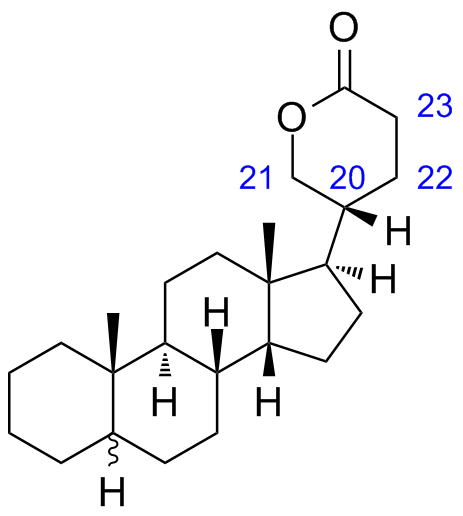
Bufanolide

== Classification ==
According to MeSH, bufadienolides and bufanolides are classified as follows:

- Polycyclic compounds
  - Steroids
    - Cardanolides
      - Cardiac glycosides
        - Bufanolides (includes bufenolides, bufadienolides, bufatrienolides)
          - Proscillaridin
          - Daigremontianin
        - Cardenolides
