= IP6K1 =

Protein-coding gene in the species Homo sapiens

Identifiers
- Aliases: IP6K1, IHPK1, PiUS, inositol hexakisphosphate kinase 1
- External IDs: OMIM: 606991; MGI: 1351633; GeneCards: IP6K1
Enzyme activity
EC #	BRENDA	ExPASy	KEGG	MetaCyc
2.7.4.21	↗	↗	↗	↗

Gene location (Human)
Chr.	Chromosome 3 (human)
Band	3p21.31	Start	49,724,294 bp
Band	3p21.31	End	49,786,542 bp

Gene location (Mouse)
Chr.	Chromosome 9 (mouse)
Band	9|9 F1	Start	107,879,700 bp
Band	9|9 F1	End	107,925,981 bp
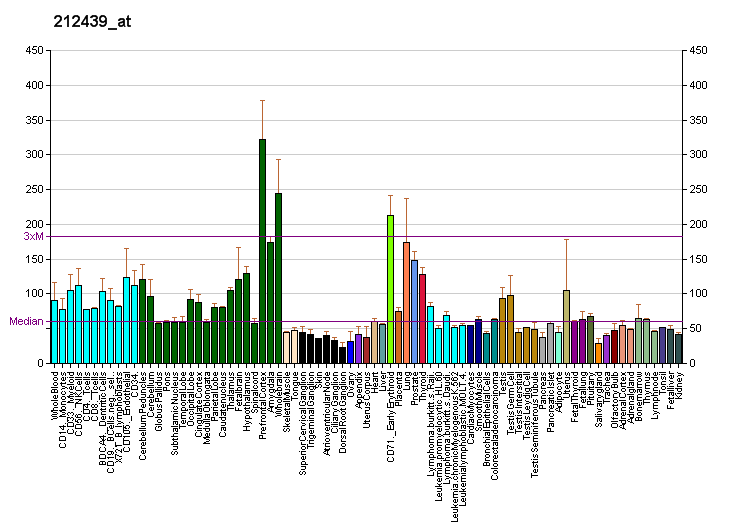
RNA expression pattern
Bgee	Human / Mouse (ortholog); Top expressed in: paraflocculus of cerebellum; middle frontal gyrus; right frontal lobe; frontal pole; prefrontal cortex; right hemisphere of cerebellum; Brodmann area 10; stromal cell of endometrium; cingulate gyrus; anterior cingulate cortex / Top expressed in: spermatid; granulocyte; dentate gyrus of hippocampal formation granule cell; spermatocyte; dorsomedial hypothalamic nucleus; neural layer of retina; cerebellar cortex; superior frontal gyrus; habenula; subiculum; More reference expression data
BioGPS	More reference expression data
Gene ontology
Molecular function	inositol hexakisphosphate 5-kinase activity; transferase activity; inositol hexakisphosphate 1-kinase activity; nucleotide binding; ATP binding; inositol hexakisphosphate 3-kinase activity; kinase activity; inositol-1,3,4,5,6-pentakisphosphate kinase activity; inositol 5-diphosphate pentakisphosphate 5-kinase activity; inositol diphosphate tetrakisphosphate kinase activity; inositol heptakisphosphate kinase activity; protein binding; inositol hexakisphosphate kinase activity
Cellular component	cytoplasm; nucleus; nucleoplasm; fibrillar center; cytosol
Biological process	phosphatidylinositol phosphate biosynthetic process; inositol phosphate metabolic process; phosphorylation; inositol phosphate biosynthetic process; negative regulation of cold-induced thermogenesis
Sources:Amigo / QuickGO
Orthologs
Databases	NCBI: entry; OMA: entry
Species	Human	Mouse
Entrez	9807	27399
Ensembl	ENSG00000176095	ENSMUSG00000032594
UniProt	Q92551	Q6PD10
RefSeq (mRNA)	NM_153273; NM_001006115; NM_001242829	NM_013785; NM_026266
RefSeq (protein)	NP_001006115; NP_001229758; NP_695005	NP_038813
Location (UCSC)	Chr 3: 49.72 – 49.79 Mb	Chr 9: 107.88 – 107.93 Mb
PubMed search
- Wikidata
View/Edit Human	View/Edit Mouse

Inositol hexakisphosphate kinase 1 is an enzyme that in humans is encoded by the IP6K1 gene.

This gene encodes a protein that belongs to the inositol phosphokinase (IPK) family. This protein is likely responsible for the conversion of inositol hexakisphosphate (InsP6) to diphosphoinositol pentakisphosphate (InsP7/PP-InsP5). It may also convert 1,3,4,5,6-pentakisphosphate (InsP5) to PP-InsP4. Alternative splicing occurs for this gene; however, the full-length nature of all transcript variants has not yet been described.

== See also ==
- Inositol-hexakisphosphate kinase
