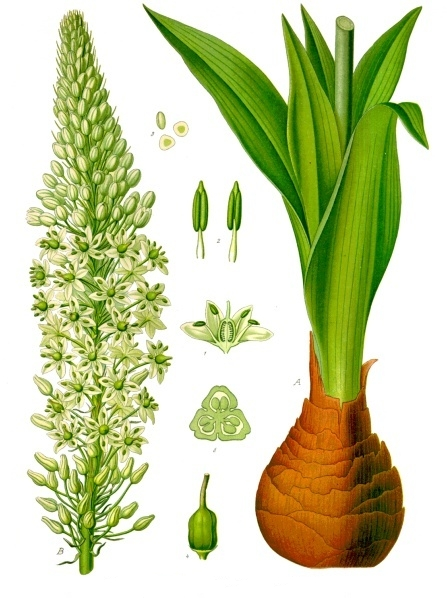

Conservation status
- Least Concern (IUCN 3.1)

Scientific classification
- Kingdom: Plantae
- Clade: Embryophytes
- Clade: Tracheophytes
- Clade: Angiosperms
- Clade: Monocots
- Order: Asparagales
- Family: Asparagaceae
- Subfamily: Scilloideae
- Genus: Drimia
- Species: D. maritima

Binomial name
- Drimia maritima (L.) Stearn

Synonyms
- Charybdis maritima (L.) Speta; Ornithogalum maritimum (L.) Lam.; Scilla maritima L.; Squilla maritima (L.) Steinh.; Stellaris scilla Moench, nom. superfl.; Urginea maritima (L.) Baker

= Drimia maritima =

Species of plant

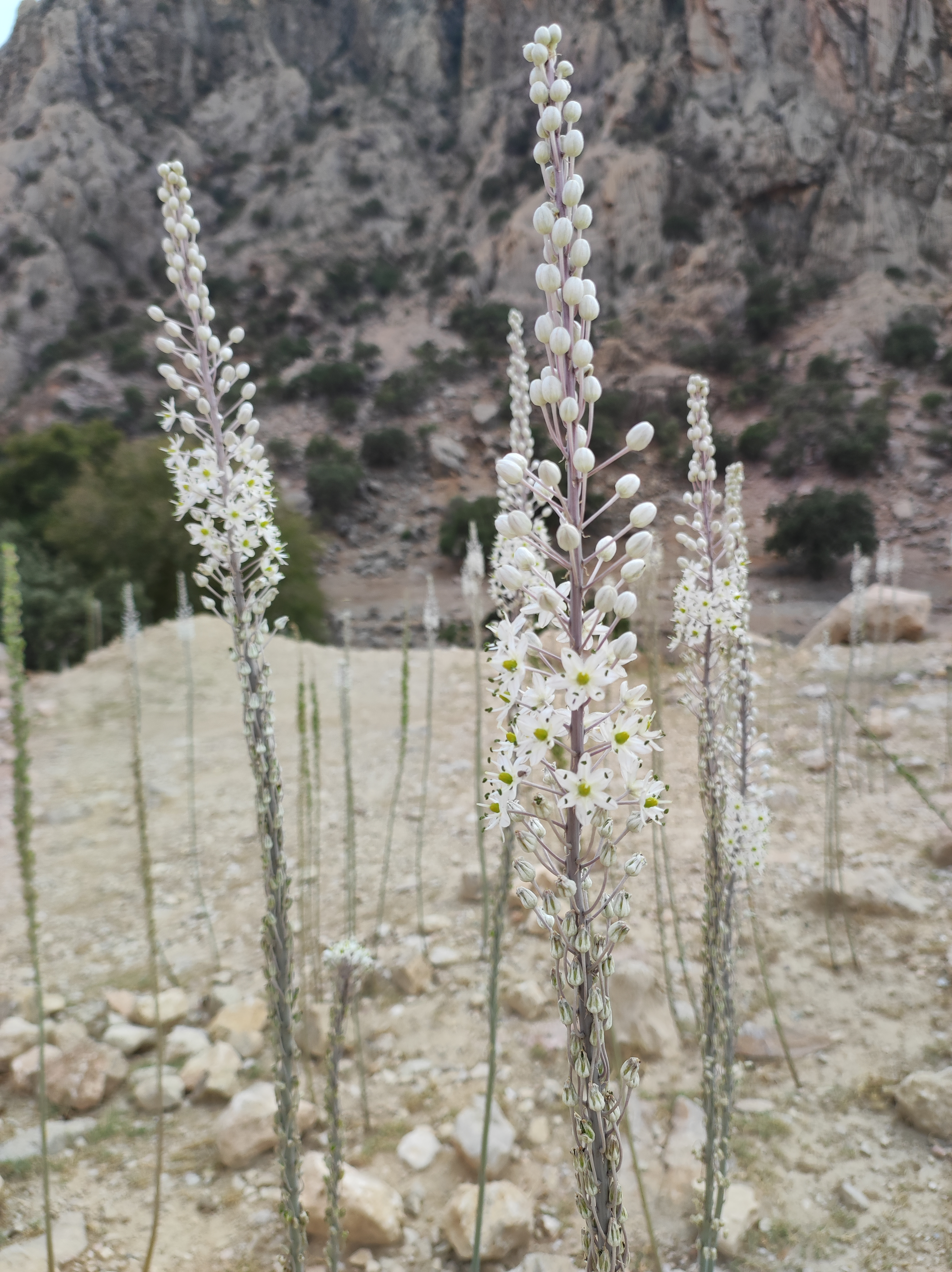
Wild Drimia maritima, Iran

Drimia maritima (syn. Urginea maritima) is a species of flowering plant in the family Asparagaceae, subfamily Scilloideae (formerly the family Hyacinthaceae). This species is known by several common names, including squill, sea squill, sea onion, and maritime squill. It may also be called red squill, particularly a form which produces red-tinged flowers instead of white, though it is likely the red color noted is actually referring to the bulb itself, not the flowers. It is native to southern Europe, western Asia, and northern Africa.

== Description ==
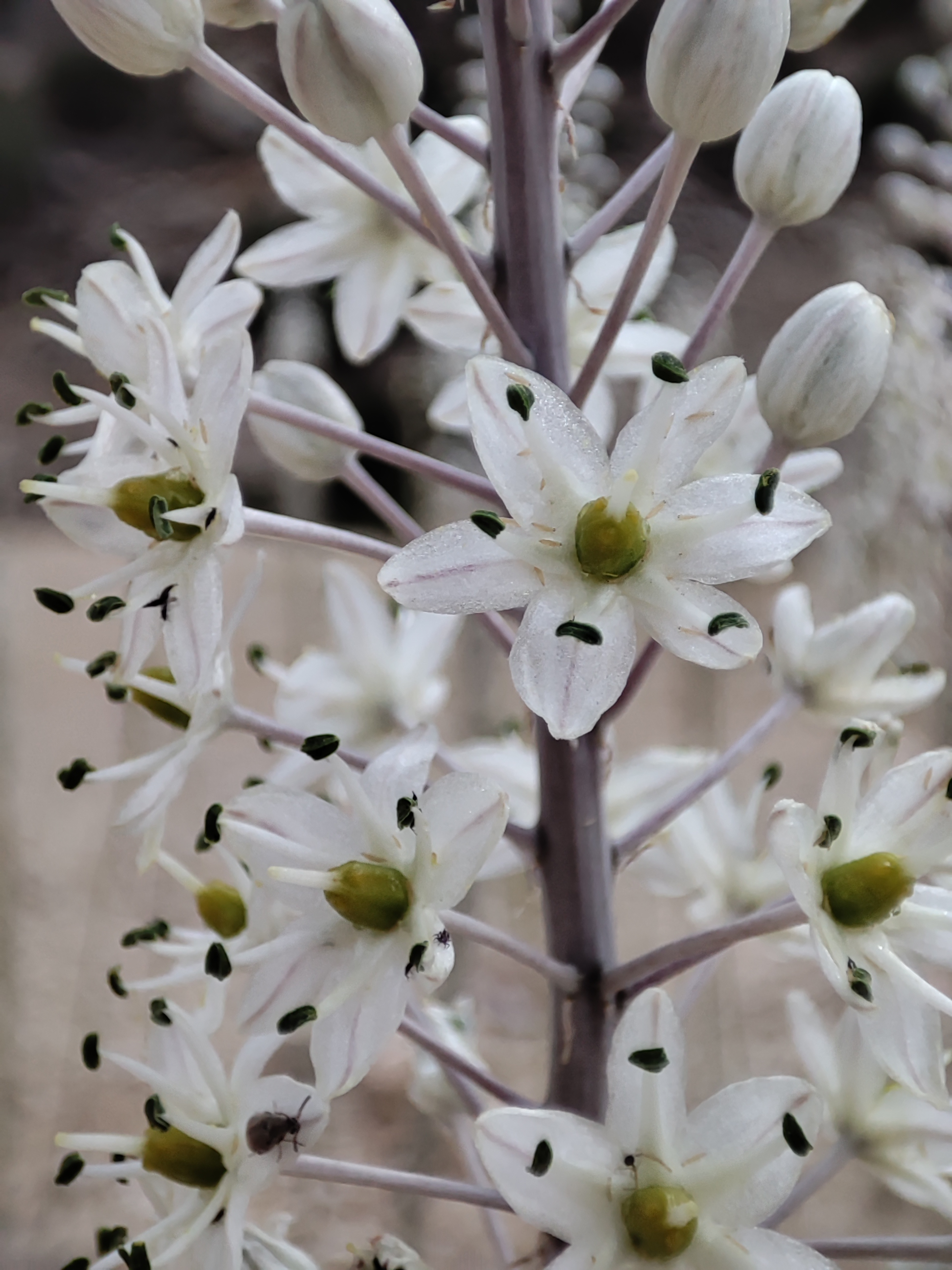
Inflorescence

This plant grows from a large bulb which can be up to 20 cm (7.9 in) wide and weigh 1 kg (2.2 lb). Bailey reported weights of up to fifteen pounds (seven kilograms), probably referring to a clump. Several bulbs may grow in a clump and are usually just beneath the surface of the soil. In the spring, each bulb produces a rosette of about ten leaves each up to a meter long. They are dark green in color and leathery in texture. They die away by autumn, when the bulb produces a tall, narrow raceme of flowers. This inflorescence can reach 1.5–2 m (4 ft 11 in – 6 ft 7 in) in height. The flower is about 1.5 cm (0.59 in) wide and has six tepals each with a dark stripe down the middle. The tepals are white, with the exception of those on the red-flowered form. The fruit is a capsule up to 1.2 cm (0.47 in) long.

== Ecology ==
This plant often grows in rocky coastal habitat, especially in the Mediterranean Basin, where it is common. It occurs in many other types of habitat, except for the driest deserts. It can grow in open and also in very shady areas. Its habit of producing leaves in the spring and flowers in the fall is an adaptation to the Mediterranean climate of its native range, where the summers are hot and dry.

This species has two different pollination syndromes, entomophily and anemophily; it is pollinated by insects and wind. Insect pollinators include the western honey bee (Apis mellifera), the Oriental hornet (Vespa orientalis), and the paper wasp species Polistes gallicus.

== Uses ==
The plant has been used as a poison and as a medicinal remedy. The main active compounds are cardiac glycosides, including unique bufadienolides such as glucoscillaren A, proscillaridine A, scillaren A, scilliglaucoside and scilliphaeoside. The plant can have a cardiac glycoside content of up to 3%. Scilliroside, the most important of the toxic compounds, is present in all parts of the plant. The broad leaves of this plant, when they completely dry out, lose their toxicity and are consumed by cattle and sheep. In Palestine and Israel, Arab farmers are known to use the plant to mark the butts and bounds of farm land, on account of the plant's distinct features. In Israel, it is traditionally considered a "harbinger of fall", and its Hebrew name "hatzav" shares a linguistic root with the words to dig or quarry, much like the bulb digs its roots into the ground.

=== Medicine ===
This species has been used as a medicinal plant since ancient times. It is noted in the Ebers Papyrus of the 16th century BC, one of the oldest medical texts of ancient Egypt. Pythagoras wrote about it in the 6th century BC. Hippocrates used it to treat jaundice, convulsions, and asthma. Theophrastus was also familiar with it. Its primary medicinal use was as a treatment for edema, then called dropsy, because of the diuretic properties of the cardiac glycosides. A solution of sea squill and vinegar was a common remedy for various ailments for centuries.

=== Pesticide ===
The plant has also been used as a rodenticide. It is very bitter, so most animals avoid it. Rats, however, eat it readily, and then succumb to scilliroside poisoning. This has made the plant a popular rodenticide for nearly as long as it has been in use as a medicine. The bulbs are dried and cut into chips, which can then be powdered and mixed with rat bait. The plant was introduced as an experimental agricultural crop in the 20th century primarily to develop high-toxicity varieties for use as rat poison. Interest continued to develop as rats became resistant to warfarin.

It has also been tested as an insecticide against the red flour beetle (Tribolium castaneum).

=== Spiritual use ===
Pythagoras and Dioscorides recorded that people hung the bulbs with sprouted leaves outside the door in spring as protection against evil spirits. The bulbs are still gathered and displayed in the winter as part of Greek Christmas and new year's traditions.

=== Ornamental use ===
The tall inflorescences are used as cut flowers in floristry.

== Gallery ==
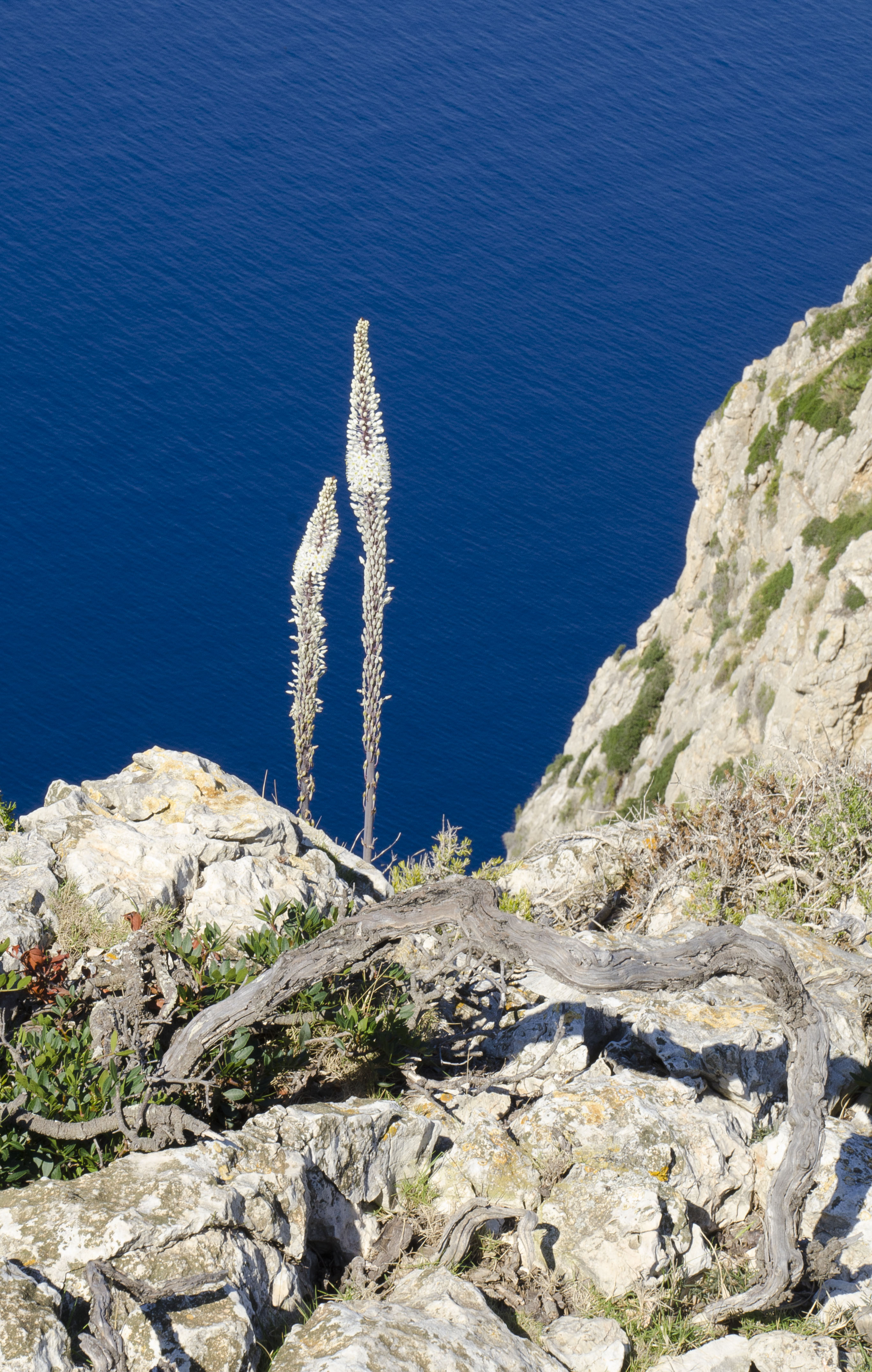
In habitat

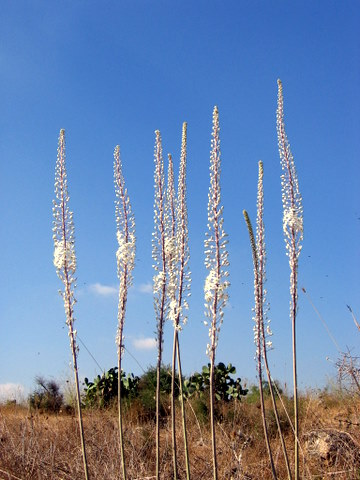
In habitat

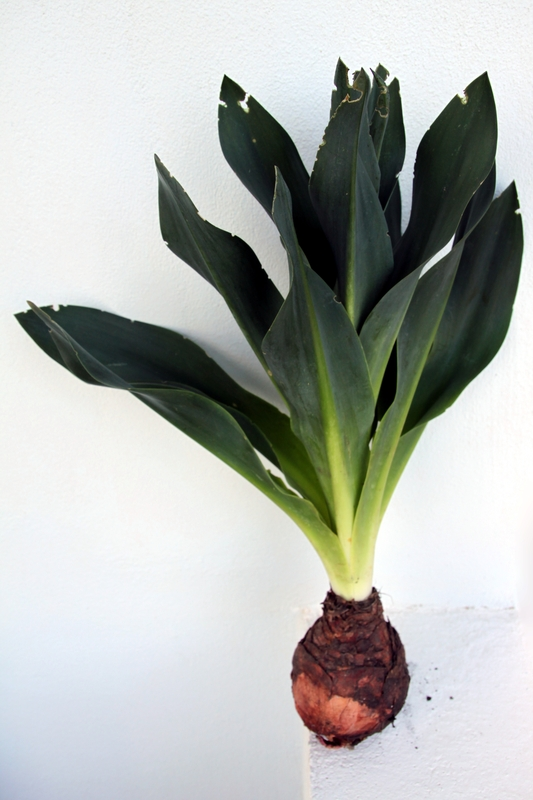
Sprouted bulb

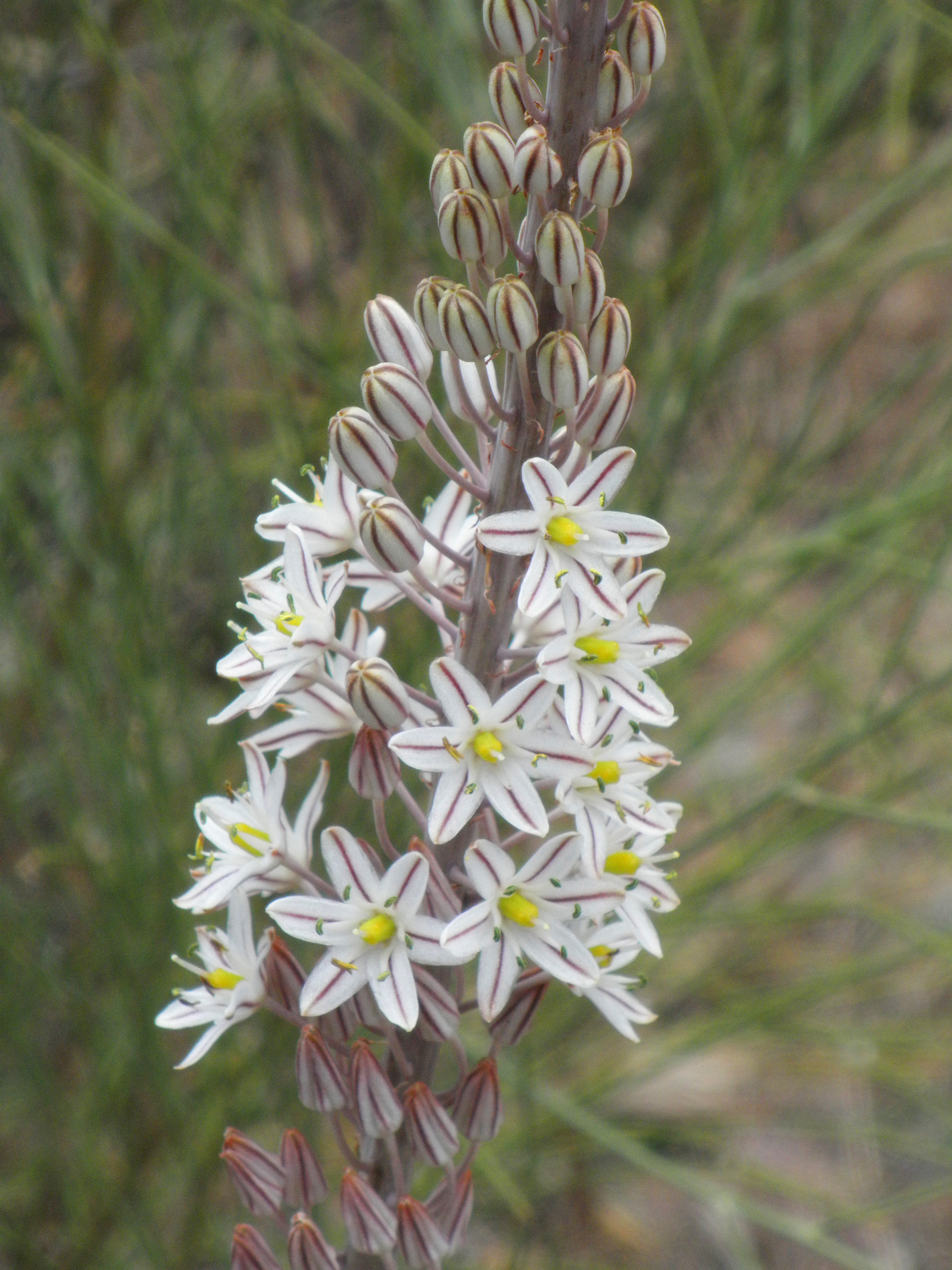
Inflorescence

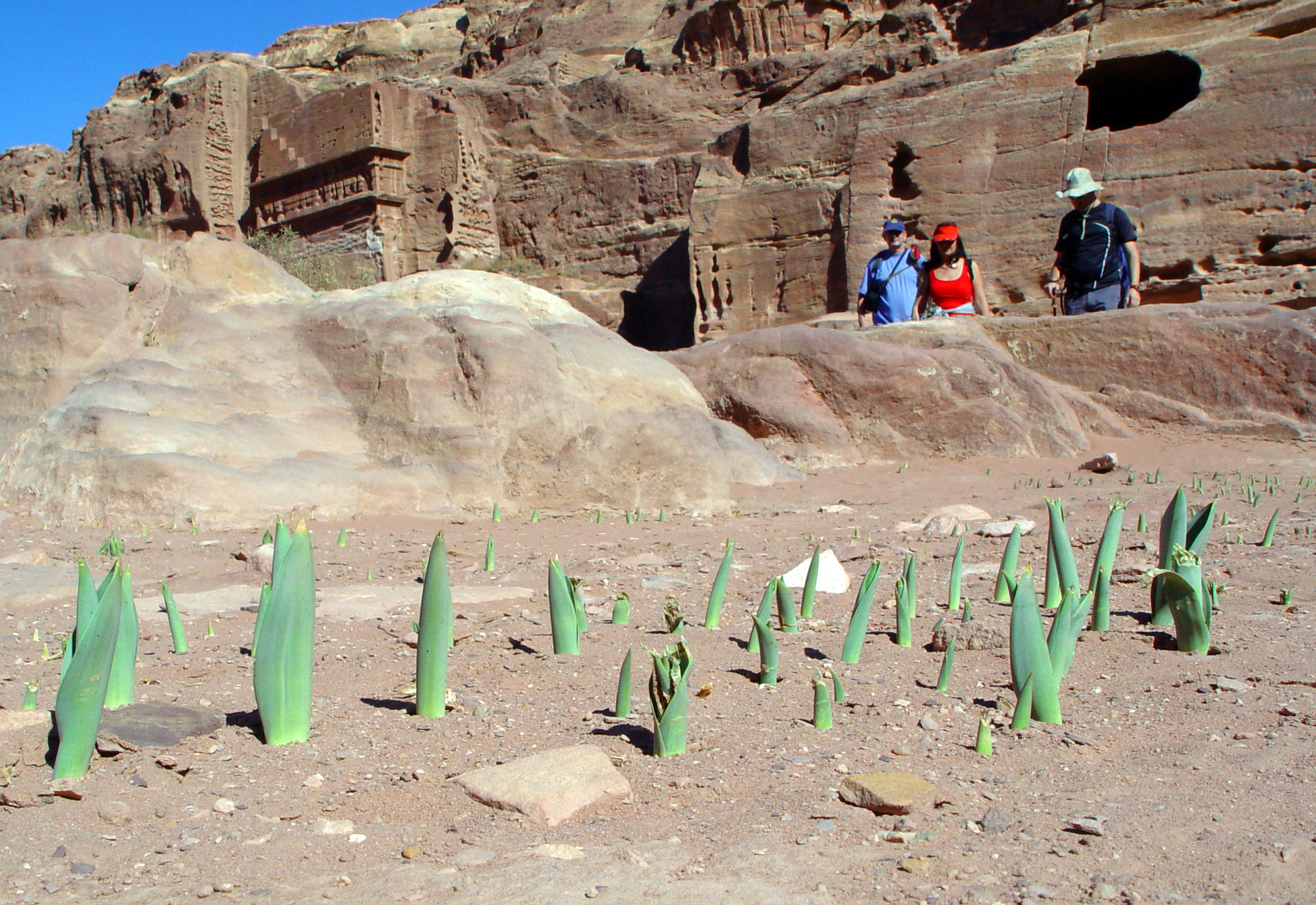
In cultivation

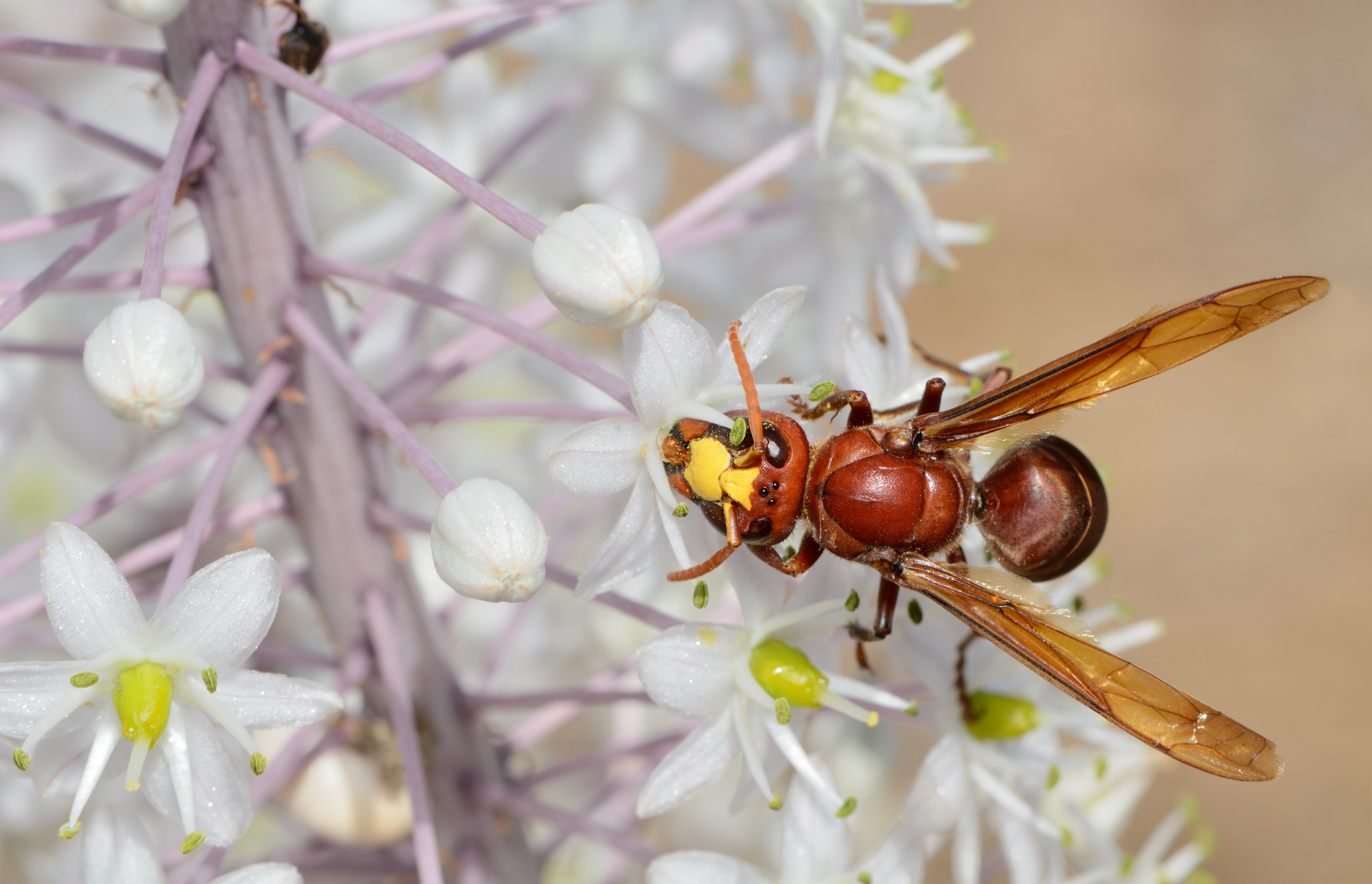
With pollinator Vespa orientalis

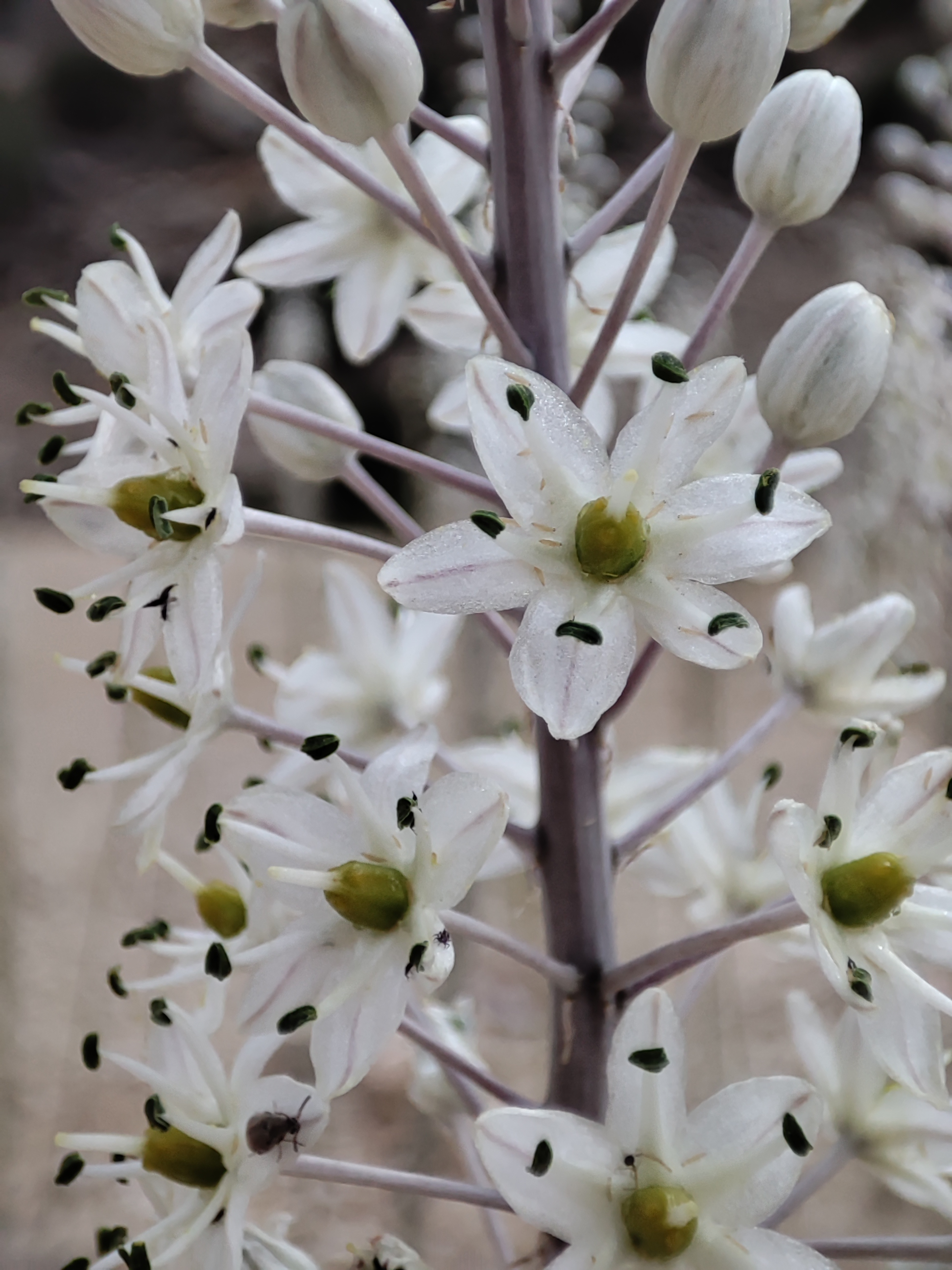
Inflorescence

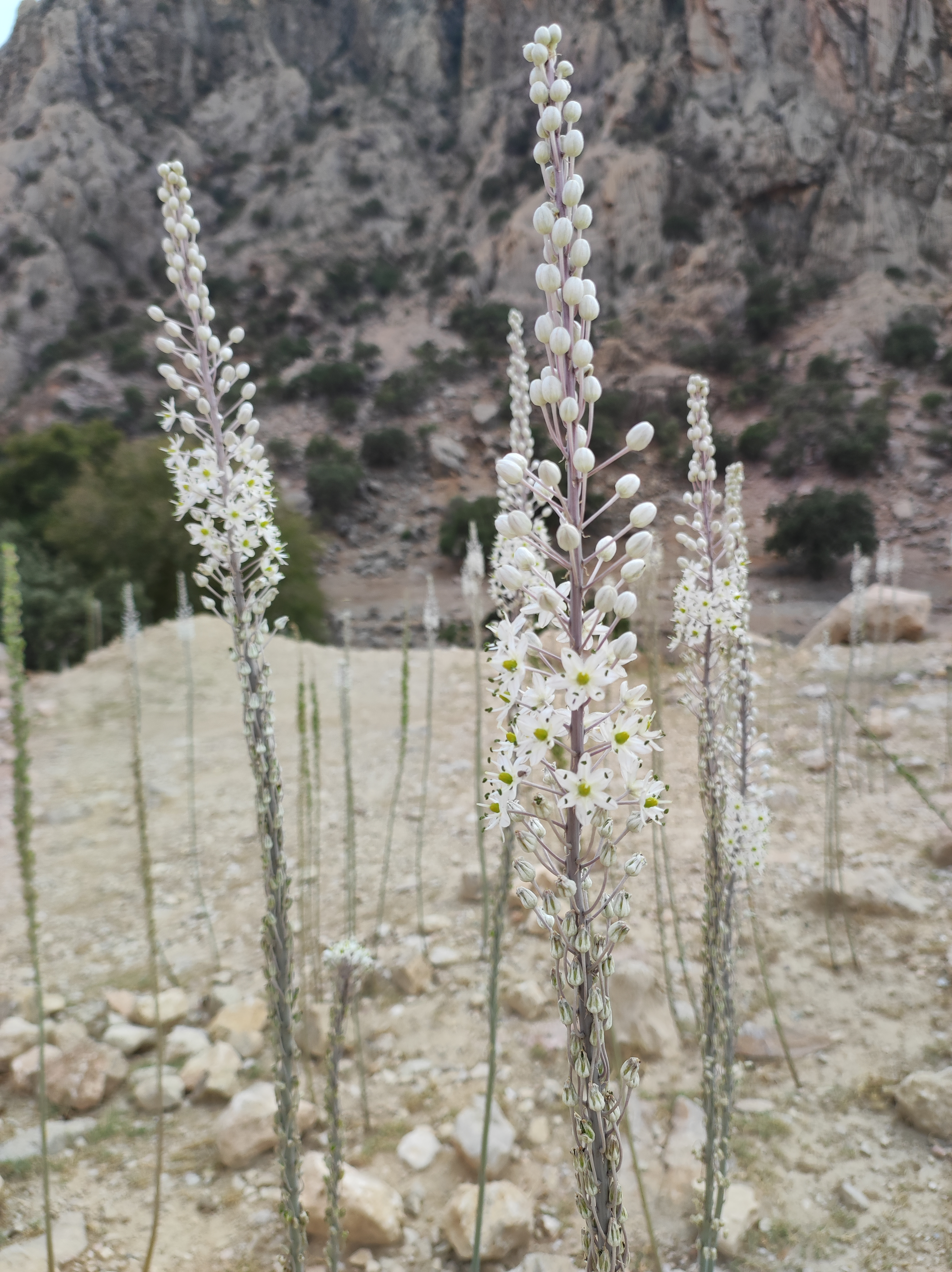
In habitat
