= Bathmotropic =

Agent affecting the excitability of the heart

Bathmotropic often refers to modifying the degree of excitability specifically of the heart; in general, it refers to modification of the degree of excitability (threshold of excitation) of musculature in general, including the heart. It especially is used to describe the effects of the cardiac nerves on cardiac excitability. Positive bathmotropic effects increase the response of muscle to stimulation, whereas negative bathmotropic effects decrease the response of muscle to stimulation. In a whole, it is the heart's reaction to catecholamines (norepinephrine, epinephrine, dopamine). Conditions that decrease bathmotropy (i.e. hypercarbia) cause the heart to be less responsive to catecholaminergic drugs. A substance that has a bathmotropic effect is known as a bathmotrope.

While bathmotropic, as used herein, has been defined as pertaining to modification of the excitability of the heart, it can also refer to modification of the irritability of heart muscle, and the two terms are frequently used interchangeably.

== History ==
In 1897 Engelmann introduced four Greek terms to describe key physiological properties of the heart: inotropy, the ability to contract; chronotropy, the ability to initiate an electrical impulse; dromotropy, the ability to conduct an electrical impulse; and bathmotropy, the ability to respond to direct mechanical stimulation. A fifth term, lusitropy, was introduced in 1982 when relaxation was recognized to be an active process, and not simply dissipation of the contractile event. In an article in the American Journal of the Medical Sciences, these five terms were described as the five fundamental properties of the heart.

== Physiological explanation ==
As various drugs and other factors act on the resting potential and bring it closer to the threshold potential, an action potential is more easily and rapidly obtained. Likewise, when the sodium channels are in a state of greater activation, then the influx of sodium ions that allows the membrane to reach threshold potential occurs more readily. In both instances, the excitability of the myocardium is increased.

== Drugs, ions and conditions ==
=== Increasing bathmotropy ===
- Hypocalcemia - calcium blocks sodium channels which prevents depolarization, so decreases in calcium allow increased sodium passage and which lowers the threshold for depolarization.
- Mild to moderate hyperkalemia - causes a partial depolarization of the resting membrane potential
- Norepinephrine and sympathetic stimulation in general - raises the resting membrane potential
- Digitalis - Converts the normal Purkinje action potential of heart muscle to the automaticity type, which increases myocardial irritability
- Epinephrine - Also known as adrenaline, effects are similar to sympathetic stimulation
- Mild hypoxia - causes a partial depolarization of the muscle membrane
- Ischaemia - causes a partial depolarization of the muscle membrane

=== Decreasing bathmotropy ===
- Hypercalcemia - decreases permeability to sodium, hyperpolarizes membrane.
- Propranolol
- Quinidine and other Class A Antiarrhythmic agents - block the voltage gated sodium channels
- Calcium channel blockers - in general have negative bathmotropic effects
- Parasympathetic stimulation - decreases excitability only of atrial muscle cells
- Hyponatremia - decreases external sodium concentration
- Hypokalemia - hyper polarization of the resting membrane potential
- Acetylcholine - same as parasympathetic stimulation
- Marked hypoxia - causes a marked depolarization of the resting membrane potential

== See also ==
- Dromotropic
- Inotrope
