= Dromotropic =

Agent affecting the delay in the AV node

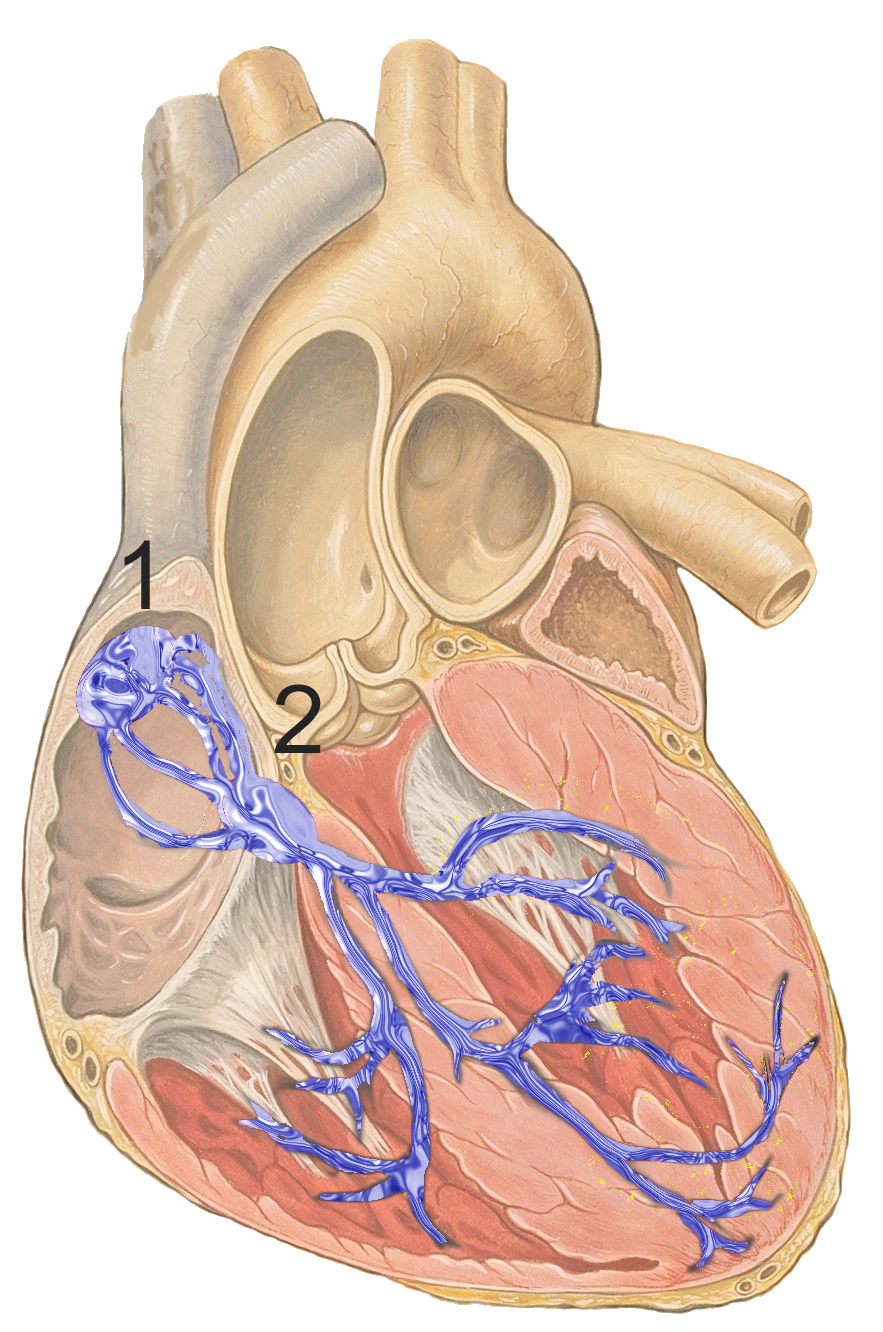

The term dromotropic derives from the Greek word δρόμος drómos, meaning "running", a course, a race. A dromotropic agent is one which affects the conduction speed (in fact the magnitude of delay) in the AV node, and subsequently the rate of electrical impulses in the heart.

Positive dromotropy increases conduction velocity (e.g. epinephrine stimulation), negative dromotropy decreases velocity (e.g. vagal stimulation).

Non-dihydropyridine calcium channel blockers such as verapamil block the slow inward calcium current in cardiac tissues, thereby having a negatively dromotropic, chronotropic and inotropic effect. This (and other) pharmacological effect makes these drugs useful in the treatment of angina pectoris. Conversely, they can lead to symptomatic disturbances in cardiac conduction and bradyarrhythmias, and may aggravate left ventricular failure.

== See also ==
- Bathmotropic
- Inotrope
- Catecholamines
