= Cardiac glycoside =

Class of organic compounds

- Drug class
- The general structure of a cardiac glycoside molecule.

Class identifiers
- Use: Congestive heart failure
- ATC code: C01A
- Biological target: Na^{+}/K^{+}-ATPase

External links
- MeSH: D002301

Legal status

Cardiac glycosides are a class of organic compounds that increase the output force of the heart and decrease its rate of contractions by inhibiting the cellular sodium-potassium ATPase pump. Their beneficial medical uses include treatments for congestive heart failure and cardiac arrhythmias; however, their relative toxicity prevents them from being widely used. Most commonly found as defensive poisons in several plant genera such as Digitalis (the foxgloves) and Asclepias (the milkweeds), these compounds nevertheless have a diverse range of biochemical effects regarding cardiac cell function and have also been suggested for use in cancer treatment.

== Chemistry ==
The general structure of a cardiac glycoside consists of a steroid molecule attached to a sugar (glycoside) and an R group. The steroid nucleus consists of four fused rings to which other functional groups such as methyl, hydroxyl, and aldehyde groups can be attached to influence the overall molecule's biological activity. Cardiac glycosides also vary in the groups attached at either end of the steroid. Specifically, different sugar groups attached at the sugar end of the steroid can alter the molecule's solubility and kinetics; however, the lactone moiety at the R group end only serves a structural function.

In particular, the structure of the ring attached at the R end of the molecule allows it to be classified as either a cardenolide or bufadienolide. Cardenolides differ from bufadienolides due to the presence of an "enolide," a five-membered ring with a single double bond, at the lactone end. Bufadienolides, on the other hand, contain a "dienolide," a six-membered ring with two double bonds, at the lactone end. While compounds of both groups can be used to influence the cardiac output of the heart, cardenolides are more commonly used medicinally, primarily due to the widespread availability of the plants from which they are derived.

Example of the chemical structure of oleandrin, a potent toxic cardiac glycoside extracted from the Oleander bush.

Cardiac glycosides can be more specifically categorized based on the plant they are derived from, as in the following list. For example, cardenolides have been primarily derived from the foxglove plants Digitalis purpurea and Digitalis lanata, while bufadienolides have been derived from the venom of the cane toad Rhinella marina (formerly known as Bufo marinus), from which they receive the "bufo" portion of their name.

Below is a list of organisms from which cardiac glycosides can be derived:

- Convallaria majalis (Lily of the Valley): convallatoxin
- Antiaris toxicaria (upas tree): antiarin
- Strophanthus kombe (Strophanthus vine): ouabain (g-strophanthin) and other strophanthins
- Digitalis lanata and Digitalis purpurea (Woolly and purple foxglove): digoxin, digitoxin
- Nerium oleander (oleander tree): oleandrin
- Asclepias sp. (milkweed): asclepin, calotropin, uzarin, calactin, coroglucigenin, uzarigenin, oleandrin
- Adonis vernalis (Spring pheasant's eye): adonitoxin
- Kalanchoe daigremontiana and other Kalanchoe species: daigremontianin
- Erysimum cheiranthoides (wormseed wallflower) and other Erysimum species
- Cerbera odollam (suicide tree): cerberin
- Periploca sepium: periplocin
- some species of Chrysolina beetles, including Chrysolina coerulans, have cardiac glycosides (based on the unusual sugar xylose) in their defensive glands.
- Leonurus cardiaca (motherwort): scillarenin
- Drimia maritima (squill): proscillaridine A
- Rhinella marina (cane toad): various bufadienolides – see also toad venom
- Helleborus orientalis

== Mechanism of action ==
Cardiac glycosides affect the sodium-potassium ATPase pump in cardiac muscle cells to alter their function. Normally, these sodium-potassium pumps move potassium ions in and sodium ions out. Cardiac glycosides, however, inhibit this pump by stabilizing it in the E2-P transition state, so that sodium cannot be extruded: intracellular sodium concentration therefore increases. With regard to potassium ion movement, because both cardiac glycosides and potassium compete for binding to the ATPase pump, changes in extracellular potassium concentration can potentially lead to altered drug efficacy. Nevertheless, by carefully controlling the dosage, such adverse effects can be avoided. Continuing on with the mechanism, raised intracellular sodium levels inhibit the function of a second membrane ion exchanger, NCX, which is responsible for pumping calcium ions out of the cell and sodium ions in at a ratio of 3Na^{+}/Ca^{2+}. Thus, calcium ions are also not extruded and will begin to build up inside the cell as well.

The disrupted calcium homeostasis and increased cytoplasmic calcium concentrations cause increased calcium uptake into the sarcoplasmic reticulum (SR) via the SERCA2 transporter. Raised calcium stores in the SR allow for greater calcium release on stimulation, so the myocyte can achieve faster and more powerful contraction by cross-bridge cycling. The refractory period of the AV node is increased, so cardiac glycosides also function to decrease heart rate. For example, the ingestion of digoxin leads to increased cardiac output and decreased heart rate without significant changes in blood pressure; this quality allows it to be widely used medicinally in the treatment of cardiac arrhythmias.

=== Non-cardiac uses ===
Cardiac glycosides were identified as senolytics: they can selectively eliminate senescent cells which are more sensitive to the ATPase-inhibiting action due to cell membrane changes.

== Clinical significance ==
Cardiac glycosides have long served as the main medical treatment to congestive heart failure and cardiac arrhythmia, due to their effects of increasing the force of muscle contraction while reducing heart rate. Heart failure is characterized by an inability to pump enough blood to support the body, possibly due to a decrease in the volume of the blood or its contractile force. Treatments for the condition thus focus on lowering blood pressure, so that the heart does not have to exert as much force to pump the blood, or directly increasing the heart's contractile force, so that the heart can overcome the higher blood pressure. Cardiac glycosides, such as the commonly used digoxin and digitoxin, deal with the latter, due to their positive inotropic activity. On the other hand, cardiac arrhythmia are changes in heart rate, whether faster (tachycardia) or slower (bradycardia). Medicinal treatments for this condition work primarily to counteract tachycardia or atrial fibrillation by slowing down heart rate, as done by cardiac glycosides.

Nevertheless, due to questions of toxicity and dosage, cardiac glycosides have been replaced with synthetic drugs such as ACE inhibitors and beta blockers and are no longer used as the primary medical treatment for such conditions. Depending on the severity of the condition, though, they may still be used in conjunction with other treatments.

== Toxicity ==
From ancient times, humans have used cardiac-glycoside-containing plants and their crude extracts as arrow coatings, homicidal or suicidal aids, rat poisons, heart tonics, diuretics and emetics, primarily due to the toxic nature of these compounds. Thus, though cardiac glycosides have been used for their medicinal function, their toxicity must also be recognized. For example, in 2008 US poison centers reported 2,632 cases of digoxin toxicity, and 17 cases of digoxin-related deaths. Because cardiac glycosides affect the cardiovascular, neurologic, and gastrointestinal systems, these three systems can be used to determine the effects of toxicity. The effect of these compounds on the cardiovascular system presents a reason for concern, as they can directly affect the function of the heart through their inotropic and chronotropic effects. In terms of inotropic activity, excessive cardiac glycoside dosage results in cardiac contractions with greater force, as further calcium is released from the SR of cardiac muscle cells. Toxicity also results in changes to heart chronotropic activity, resulting in multiple kinds of dysrhythmia and potentially fatal ventricular tachycardia. These dysrhythmias are an effect of an influx of sodium and decrease of resting membrane potential threshold in cardiac muscle cells. When taken beyond a narrow dosage range specific to each particular cardiac glycoside, these compounds can rapidly become dangerous. In sum, they interfere with fundamental processes that regulate membrane potential. They are toxic to the heart, the brain, and the gut at doses that are not difficult to reach. In the heart, the most common negative effect is premature ventricular contraction.
