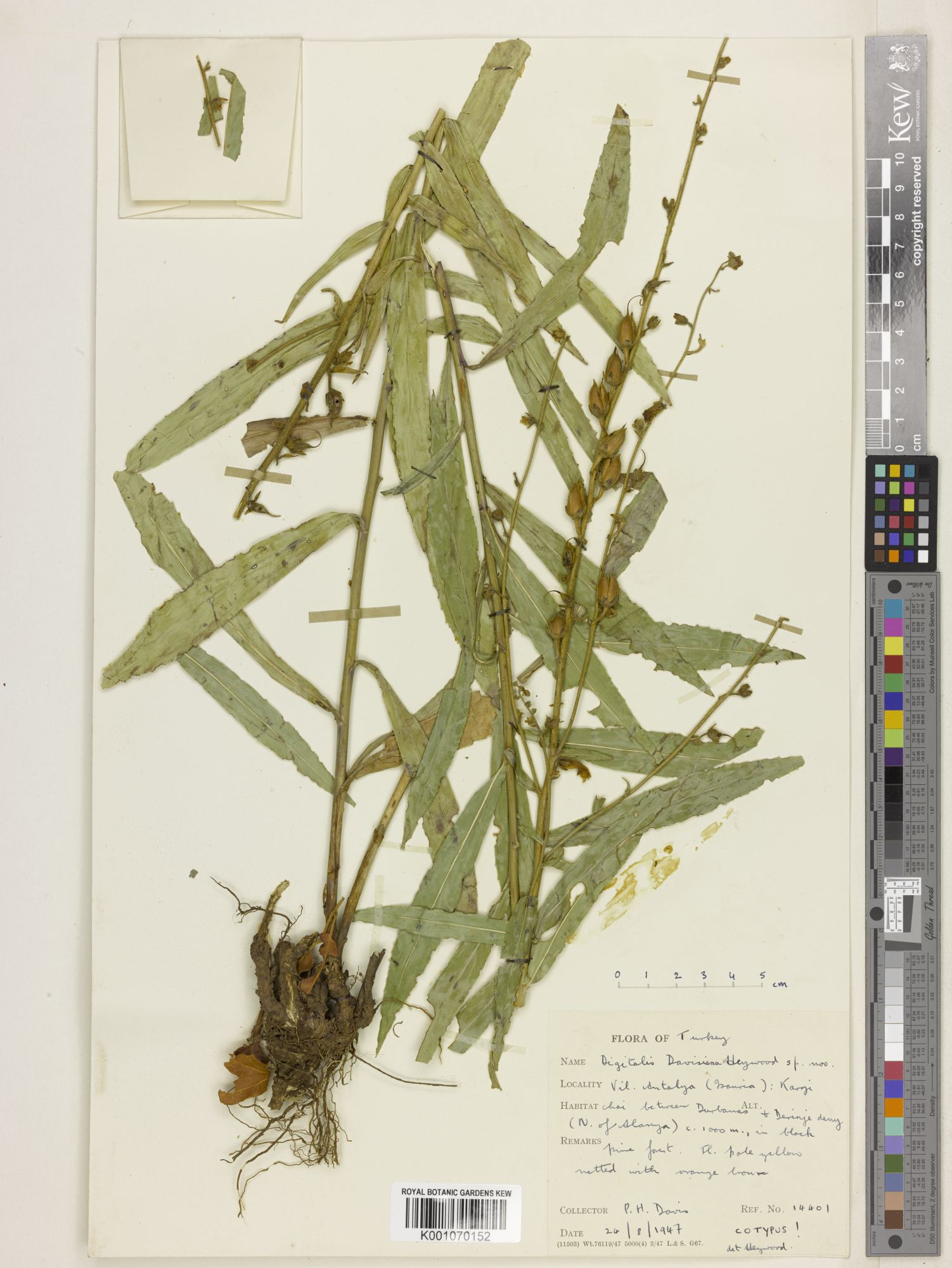
- Digitalis davisiana specimen at Kew Herbarium, collected by Peter H. Davis north-east of Alanya, Turkey

Scientific classification
- Kingdom: Plantae
- Clade: Tracheophytes
- Clade: Angiosperms
- Clade: Eudicots
- Clade: Asterids
- Order: Lamiales
- Family: Plantaginaceae
- Genus: Digitalis
- Species: D. davisiana

Binomial name
- Digitalis davisiana Heywood

= Digitalis davisiana =

Species of foxglove

Digitalis davisiana is a species of foxglove, a herbaceous plant in the genus Digitalis in the family Plantaginaceae, formerly in the Scrophulariaceae and briefly the Veronicaceae. It is native to Turkey.

== Taxonomy ==
Digitalis davisiana was first scientifically discovered and collected in 1947 by the British botanist Peter Hadland Davis, who was very active in describing the flora of Turkey, Davis had actually first discovered the species growing on Şandras mountain in Muğla vilayet, Anatolia, in July, but he collected it again a month later in the mountains north-east of the city of Alanya, in Antalya vilayet. Although the specimens were initially tentatively determined to be D. ambigua (now considered to be synonym of D. grandiflora), it was thence described as an entirely new species by another British botanist, Vernon Hilton Heywood, in 1949, designating a specimen from Davis' second collection, now housed in the Kew Herbarium, as the holotype. Heywood coined the specific epithet davisiana in honour of its discoverer.

In 1965, in the last full monograph of the genus Digitalis, the German botanist Klaus Werner classified this species in the section Grandiflorae, along with the type species D. grandiflora, as well as D. atlantica and D. ciliata. Heywood also called it the section Macranthae. These were distinguished by being herbaceous species with bell-shaped, ochre to yellow flowers with short pedicels to one side of the scape. Later molecular studies into the phylogeny of the genus found that D. davisiana was correctly placed within this section, but that it should also contain the species D. lutea and D. viridiflora from the section Tubiflorae. In this study the section Grandiflorae was redefined as being perennial or biennial, herbaceous, sparsely pubescent, leaves more or less smooth to the touch, and with flowers in one-sided racemes with short pedicels, a corolla which is bell-shaped or ventricose, ochre to yellow and with dark veins on the lower part.

== Description ==
Digitalis davisiana is a perennial plant which flowers in early summer. It grows up to 70 cm (28 in) tall, and 30 cm (12 in) wide.

- Leaves: Mid-green, finely toothed, hairless (glabrous), linear lance-shaped leaves to 7–12 cm (3–5 in) in length.
- Flowers: Flowers are borne in loose racemes and are pale yellow, with orange veins. They measure 3–4 cm (1.25-1.5 in) in length.

== Distribution ==
It is endemic to southern Anatolia (Asiatic Turkey), where it occurs in the mountains to the north of the city of Alanya. It was first found between Durbanas and Derinji in Antalya vilayet, as well as Şandras mountain (Şandras Dağ) and possibly elsewhere in Muğla vilayet. It has also been collected in the Geyik Mountains (Geyik Daglari), part of the Central Taurus Mountains (Orta Toroslar).

== Ecology ==
Digitalis davisiana was originally collected at approximately 1,000 metres in altitude in a forest of black pine (Pinus nigra). It has also been collected at approximately 900 metres in altitude. It has furthermore been recorded near Demirtaş, growing on rocky limestone slopes in somewhat open forests of Turkish pine (Pinus brutia) at 840 to 860 metres in altitude, in association with the other regional endemics: Bupleurum subuniflorum, Cephalaria isaurica, Ferulago isaurica, Peucedanum isauricum and Origanum saccatum.

== Uses ==
=== Horticulture ===
It grows in climates to UK zone 8. It is susceptible to leaf spot and powdery mildew.

It is grown in a number of botanical gardens, such as the Botanischer Garten Jena, the Jardin Botanique de Montréal, the Ecological-Botanical Garden of the University of Bayreuth and the Bergianska trädgården.

== Conservation ==
According to a study of the Turkish endemic species of Muğla vilayet, Digitalis cariensis was assessed as 'least concern' in the 2000 Red Data Book of Turkish Plants; this was updated to the version 3.1 IUCN Red List Categories of 2001 (also 'least concern') in the study.
