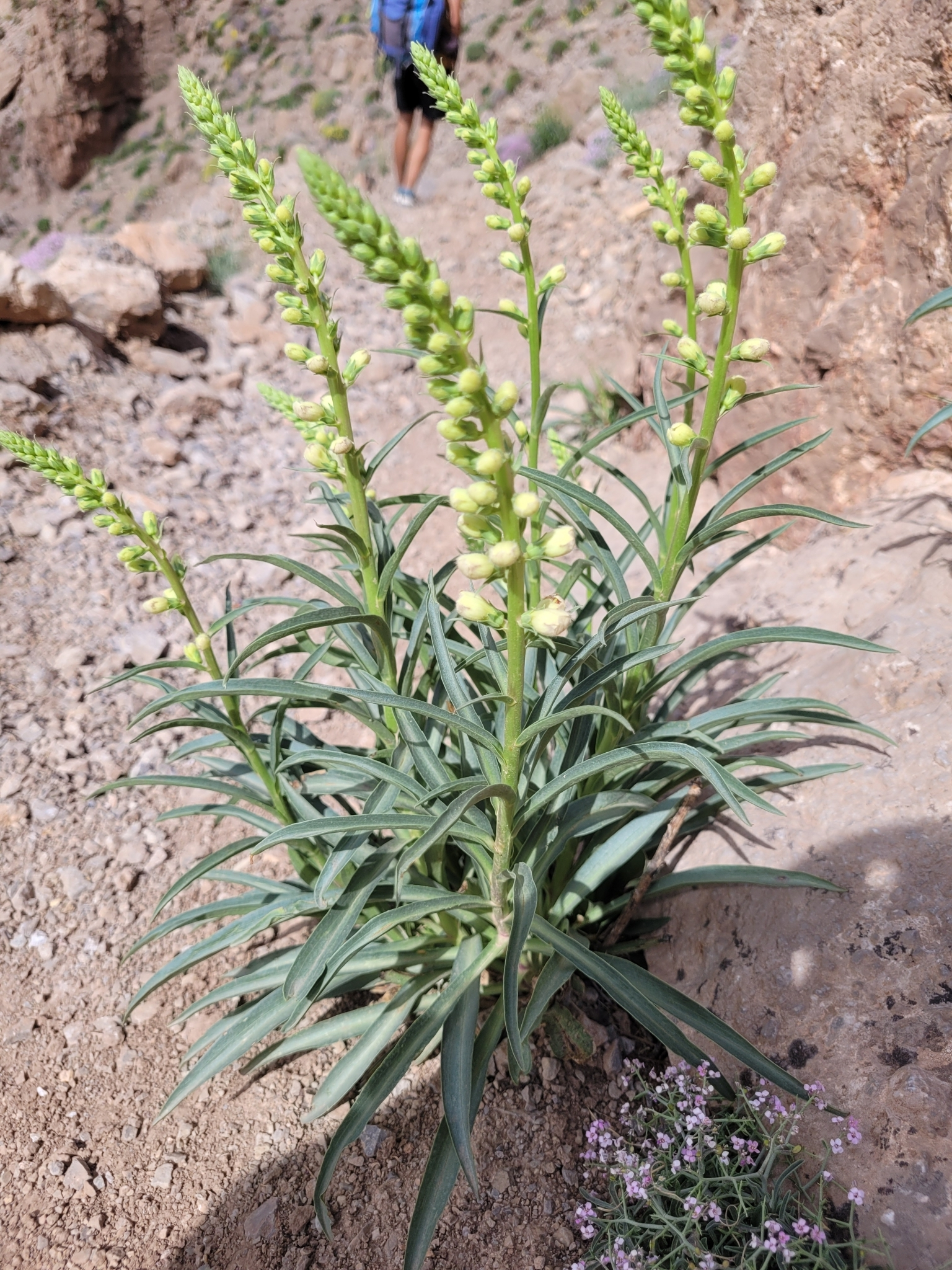

Scientific classification
- Kingdom: Plantae
- Clade: Tracheophytes
- Clade: Angiosperms
- Clade: Eudicots
- Clade: Asterids
- Order: Lamiales
- Family: Plantaginaceae
- Genus: Digitalis
- Species: D. transiens

Binomial name
- Digitalis transiens Maire

Synonyms
- Homotypic synonyms: Digitalis lutea subsp. transiens (Maire) Emb. & Maire; Digitalis subalpina var. transiens (Maire) Ivanina; Heterotypic synonyms: Digitalis lutea var. atlantica Ball (1878); Digitalis lutea subsp. atlantica (Ball) Litard. (1928); Digitalis subalpina var. mesatlantica (Maire) Ivanina; Digitalis transiens var. mesatlantica Maire (1940); Digitalis lutea var. mesatlantica (Maire) Maire (1941)

= Digitalis transiens =

Species of plant

Digitalis transiens is a species of flowering plant in the family Plantaginaceae which is endemic to Morocco. It has yellow flowers with woolly hairs on its lip and throat. The corolla length is 11 to 13mm.

== Taxonomy ==
A specimen of Digitalis transiens collected at an altitude of around 2,000 metres near Aït Mesan in the Atlas Mountains by Johannes Justus Rein and Karl Fritsch during their excursion to Morocco in the early 1870s had been misidentified as D. atlantica, and using that misidentification, in 1878 the Irish botanist John Ball then synonymised D. atlantica to D. lutea in error.

It took until 1940 before the French botanist René Maire described it as a new species, but it has since had a confused and turbulent taxonomic history. Karol Marhold in 2011 in the Euro+Med Plantbase, for example, does not even recognise the species, but does include two different taxa both called D. atlantica, the correct one endemic to Algeria, and the other Moroccan one without authority attribution presumably being D. transiens.

== Description ==
Based on Ball's 1878 description, it is distinguished from Digitalis lutea by having smaller, more abundant flowers, and the leaves in the inflorescence being somewhat bract-like.
