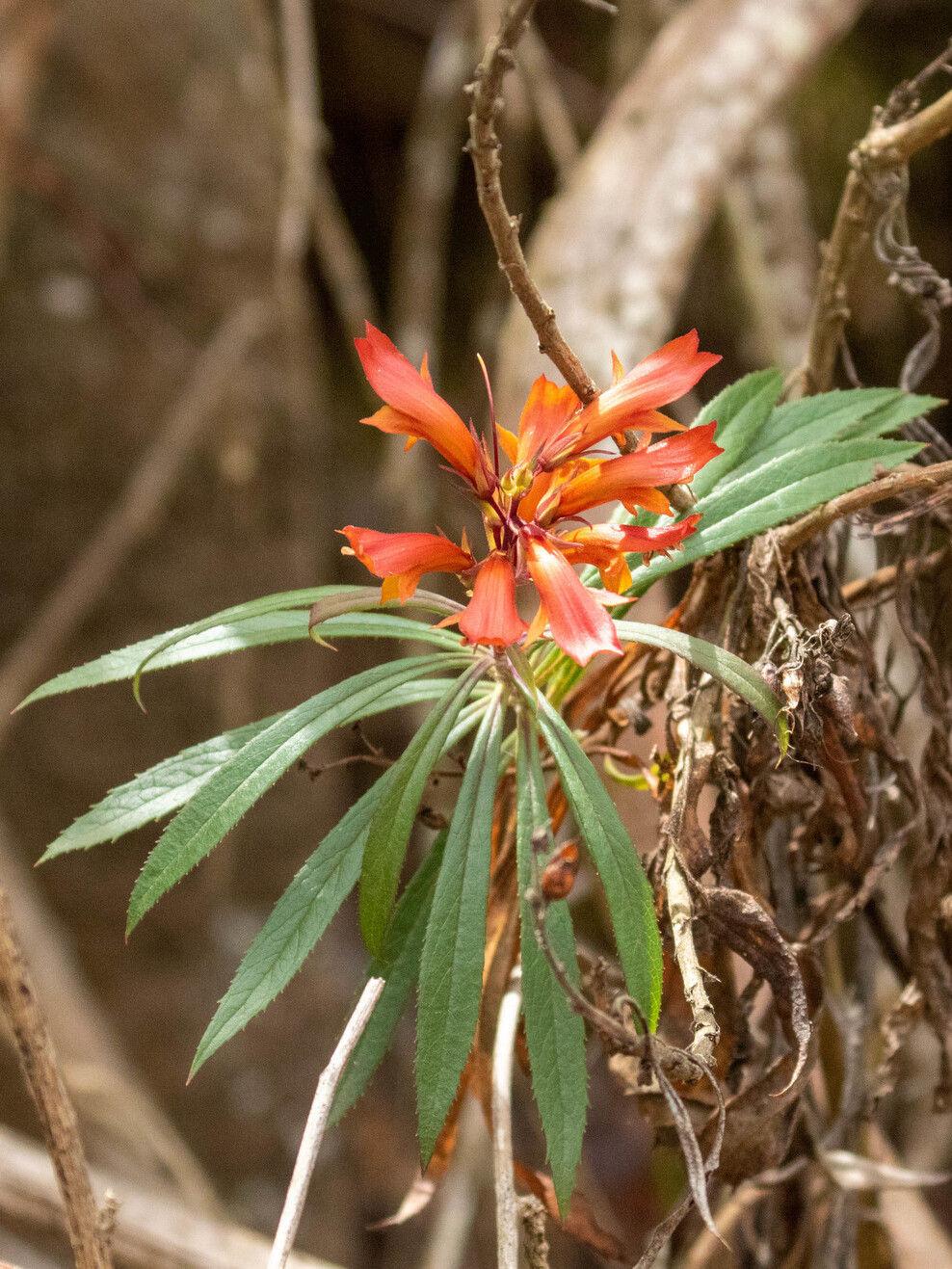

Conservation status
- Critically Endangered (IUCN 3.1)

Scientific classification
- Kingdom: Plantae
- Clade: Embryophytes
- Clade: Tracheophytes
- Clade: Spermatophytes
- Clade: Angiosperms
- Clade: Eudicots
- Clade: Asterids
- Order: Lamiales
- Family: Plantaginaceae
- Genus: Digitalis
- Species: D. chalcantha

Binomial name
- Digitalis chalcantha (Svent. & O'Shan.) Albach, Bräuchler & Heubl

Synonyms
- Isoplexis chalcantha Svent. & O'Shan.

= Digitalis chalcantha =

Species of flowering plant

Digitalis chalcantha is a flowering evergreen shrub in the family Plantaginaceae. It is native to the Canary Islands, specifically Gran Canaria.

== Description ==
Digitalis chalcantha is one of three foxglove species that are endemic to the Canary Islands, along with Digitalis canariensis and Digitalis isabelliana. These species are distinguished from other foxgloves by their tubular flowers, which have a large upper lip instead of a large lower lip.

D. chalcantha is an upright-growing, evergreen shrub growing to 1.2 m (3 ft 11 in) high, with upright stems and long, lanceolate, slightly serrated dark green leaves. Inflorescence consists of long spikes of russet-orange flowers, with long hoods, a bi-lobed upper lip, and a three-lobed lower lip. The stamens are tipped with white anthers.

== Habitat and distribution ==
Digitalis chalcantha favours well-drained slopes and walls, between 400–900 m (1,300–3,000 ft) above sea level. Colonies have been found in the northern region of Gran Canaria.

Digitalis chalcantha has been assessed as a critically endangered species on the IUCN Red List.
