= Ingwersen =

Ingwersen is a surname. Notable people with the surname include:

- Axel Ingwersen, winner of the Blue Water Medal
- Burt Ingwersen (1898–1969), American college football coach
- Jens Ingwersen (1871–1956), Danish architect
- Peter Ingwersen (born 1962), Danish fashion designer
- Will Ingwersen (1905–1990), nurseryman and alpine specialist of renown
