= Glaucosciadium =

Scientific classification
- Kingdom: Plantae
- Clade: Tracheophytes
- Clade: Angiosperms
- Clade: Eudicots
- Clade: Asterids
- Order: Apiales
- Family: Apiaceae
- Subfamily: Apioideae
- Tribe: Scandiceae
- Genus: Glaucosciadium; B.L.Burtt & P.H.Davis

Genus of plants

Glaucosciadium is a genus of flowering plants belonging to the family Apiaceae.

Its native range is Southern Turkey, Cyprus, Iran.

Species:

- Glaucosciadium cordifolium (Boiss.) B.L.Burtt & P.H.Davis
- Glaucosciadium insigne (Pimenov & Maassoumi) Spalik & S.R.Downie
