= Eupithecia pyreneata =

Scientific classification
- Kingdom: Animalia
- Phylum: Arthropoda
- Clade: Pancrustacea
- Class: Insecta
- Order: Lepidoptera
- Family: Geometridae
- Genus: Eupithecia
- Species: E. pyreneata

Binomial name
- Eupithecia pyreneata Mabille, 1871

Synonyms
- Eupithecia digitaliaria Dietze, 1872

Species of moth

Eupithecia pyreneata is a moth in the family Geometridae. It is found in southern and central Europe.

The wingspan is 17–18 mm. There usually is one generation with adults on wing from June to July. In southern Europe, a partial second generation may occur.

The larvae fee don Digitalis lutea and Digitalis grandiflora. Larvae can be found from the end of June to August. The species overwinters in the pupal stage.

== Subspecies ==
- Eupithecia pyreneata pyreneata
- Eupithecia pyreneata granadensis Bubacek, 1926
