= Digitalis ikarica =

Scientific classification
- Kingdom: Plantae
- Clade: Tracheophytes
- Clade: Angiosperms
- Clade: Eudicots
- Clade: Asterids
- Order: Lamiales
- Family: Plantaginaceae
- Genus: Digitalis
- Species: D. ikarica

Binomial name
- Digitalis ikarica (P.H.Davis) Strid

Synonyms
- Digitalis leucophaea subsp. ikarica P.H.Davis; Digitalis cariensis subsp. ikarica (P.H.Davis) Strid

Species of plant in the foxglove family

Digitalis ikarica is a species of foxglove, a perennial flowering plant in the plantain family Plantaginaceae. It is native to the East Aegean islands. Its name comes from the island of Ikaria, where it is common on roadside verges.

== Description ==
Digitalis ikarica differs from other foxglove types in that it produces branched flower spikes or rosettes rather than a single, upright stem.
