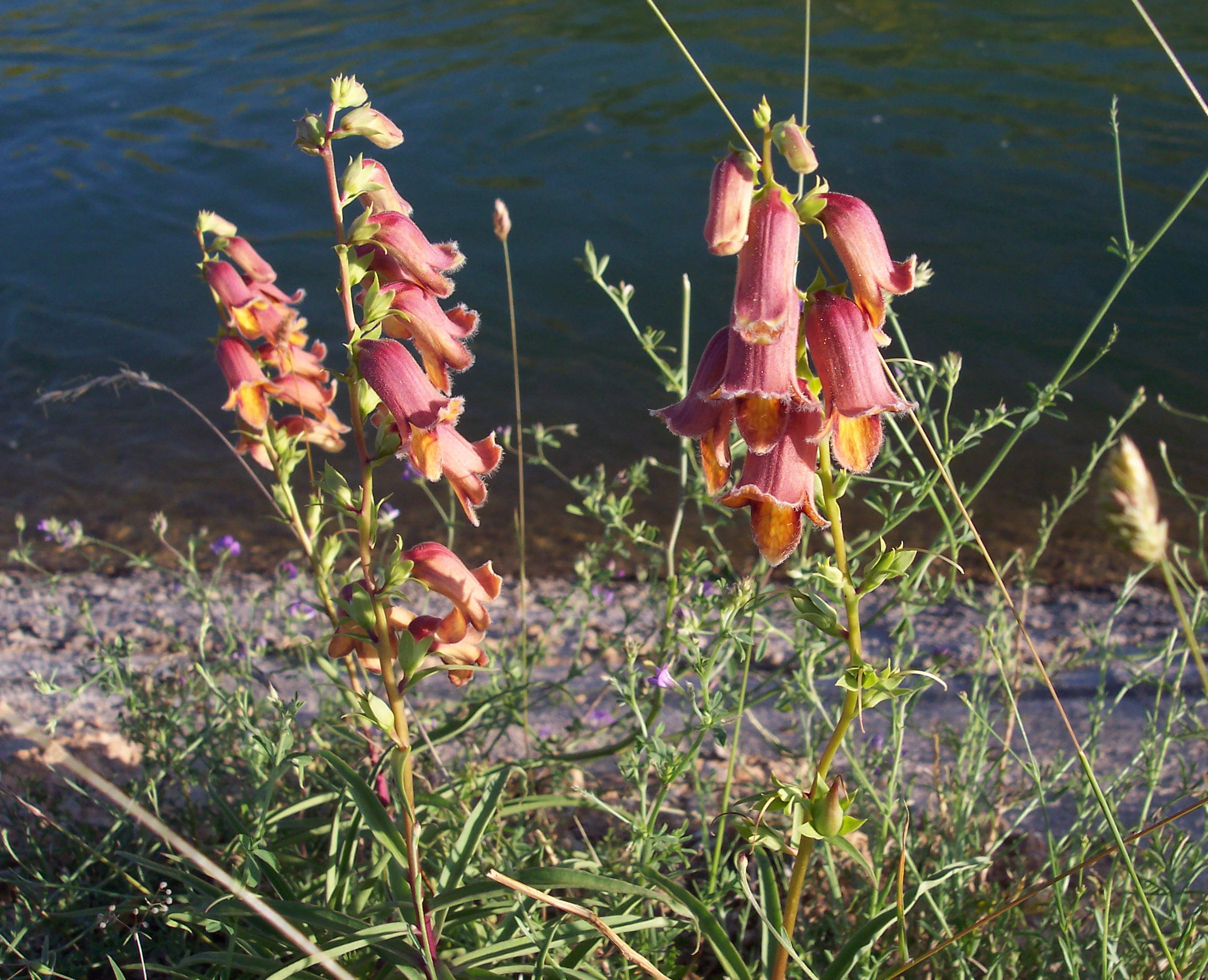

Scientific classification
- Kingdom: Plantae
- Clade: Tracheophytes
- Clade: Angiosperms
- Clade: Eudicots
- Clade: Asterids
- Order: Lamiales
- Family: Plantaginaceae
- Genus: Digitalis
- Species: D. obscura

Binomial name
- Digitalis obscura L.

= Digitalis obscura =

Species of plant

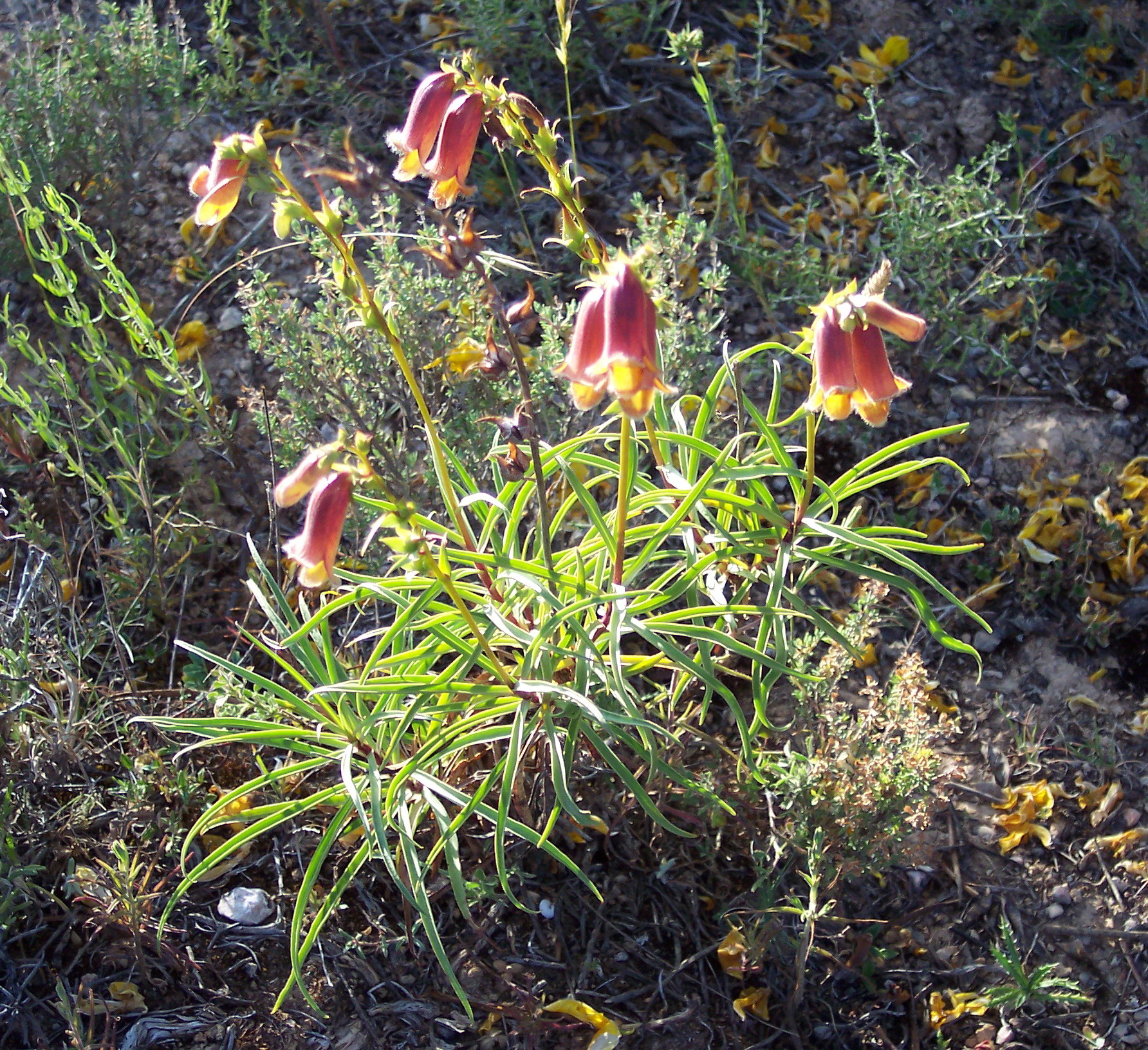
Digitalis obscura

Digitalis obscura, commonly called willow-leaved foxglove or dusty foxglove or Spanish rusty foxglove, is a flowering plant native to regions in Spain and Morocco. It is also grown as an ornamental flower. This foxglove is a woody perennial plant belonging to the family Plantaginaceae. Along with the other foxgloves it used to be placed in the figwort family, Scrophulariaceae; however, recent genetic research has moved the genus Digitalis to a larger family. It is similar to many of the foxglove species in its high toxicity and medicinal use as a source for the heart-regulating drug digoxin. Its strikingly distinctive amber- to copper-coloured flowers give the species its name and help distinguish it from other members of the genus.

== Distribution ==
Digitalis obscura is native to the western Mediterranean in eastern and southern Spain and northern Morocco, where it is found growing in dry, open woods and often on limestone.

Digitalis obscura subsp. laciniata is found in the mountains of southern Spain and northern Morocco. It has serrate or deeply toothed leaf margins in contrast to the smooth margins of the species.

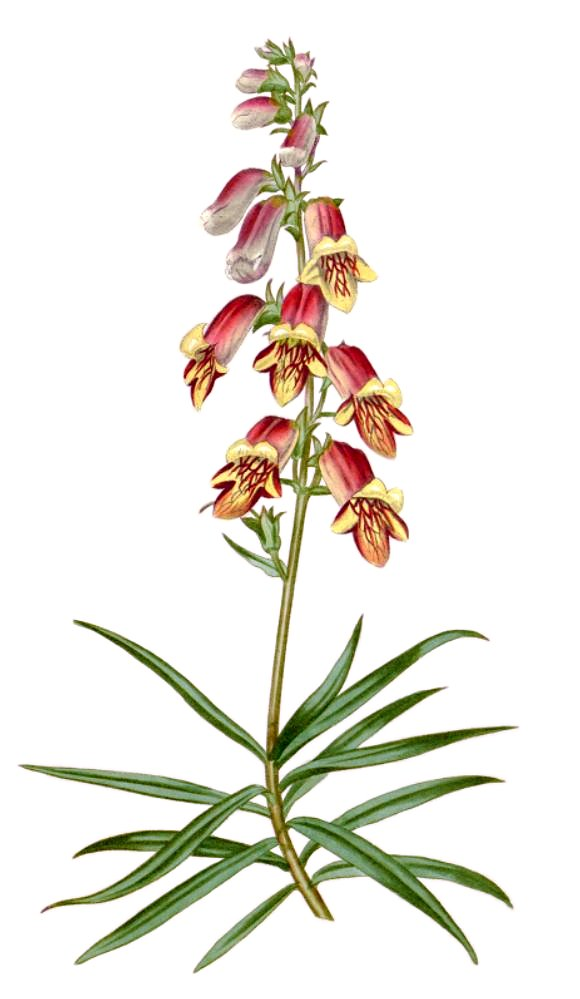
artist depiction of Digitalis obscura

== Description ==
Digitalis obscura is a shrub or herbaceous perennial growing from a woody base, reaching 1 to 3.9 feet (0.30 to 1.19 m) tall. The stems are smooth and erect. The long leaves are basal and form in a rosette fashion, growing outward closer to the ground. Smaller leaves grow alternately along the stem. The thick, glossy leaves are lanceolate in shape, with acute tips. The leaves have a blue-green color and a leathery texture that gives them a shine. A mature plant spreads over the ground to about 0.75–1.5 feet.

=== Flowers ===
The many flowers of the plant are large and tubular, opening into a funnel shape. They droop from the point of attachment to the stem, occurring in clusters on the same side of the floral axis. The flowers are approximately 1.5 inches (3.8 cm) long and have an appearance of dropping bells or snipped-off fingers as the common name of the genus, foxglove, suggests. This foxglove is distinguished by its rusty dark-orange to green-yellow flowers. Inside the flowers, red venation and spotting can also be seen as well as tiny hairs at the tips. The arrangement of the flowers in respect to the stalk is racemes and the flowers droop downward.

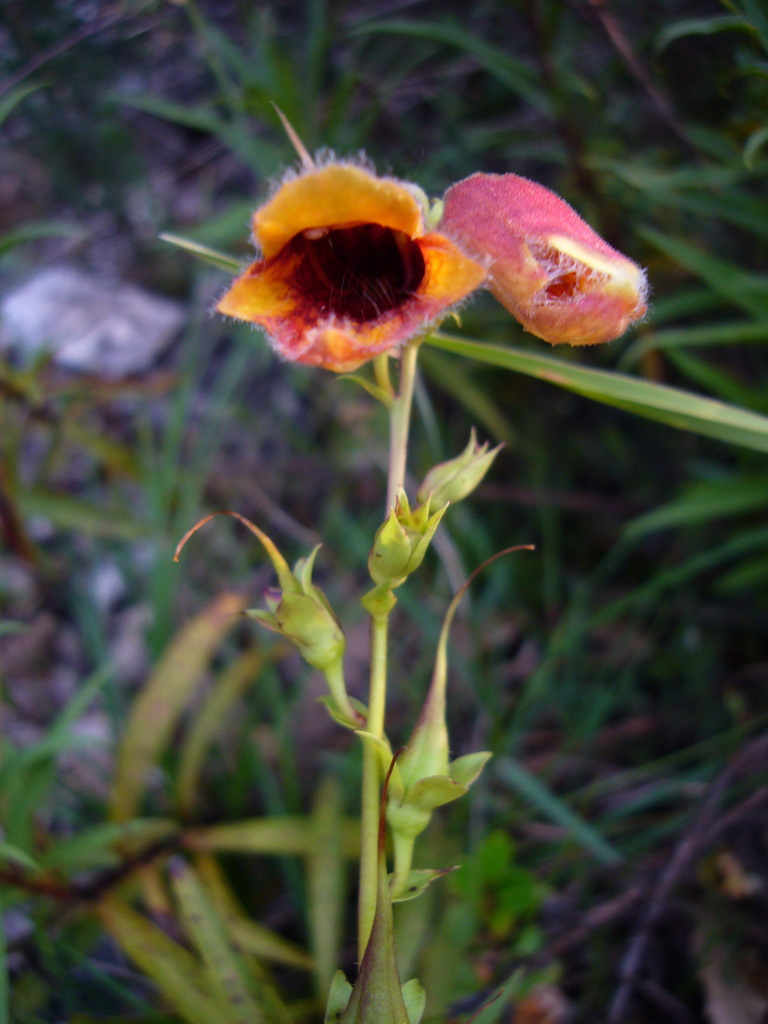
Digitalis obscura flowers close-up

== Ecology ==
It occurs in both the mountains and the lowlands near the coast. It blooms during late spring.

== Uses ==
=== Horticulture ===
Digitalis obscura is grown in many non-native areas as an ornamental plant. It naturally grows well in dry climates and in high altitudes and is winter hardy in USDA zones 4 to 8. Unlike many other foxgloves, it is drought-tolerant when it is deeply rooted and established. D. obscura grows in either full or partial sun. It prefers average to well-drained soil with pH levels of 5.8–7.2. It may die if left in wet soil over winter. Once established, it is perennial and grows at a rather moderate to fast pace. It is non-invasive and attracts hummingbirds. It is naturally resistant to deer and rabbits.

=== Medicinal ===
Digitalis obscura, like many of the other foxgloves, has been used in medicine as a diuretic and to treat heart conditions. For people suffering from heart disease or other heart-related conditions, it can be used to regulate heart rate. In human folk medicine, D. obscura was used for many purposes, such as treating wounds and toothaches. However, the use of herbal medicinal remedies using Digitalis obscura has lessened to a great degree because of the knowledge of its high toxicity.

In ethnoveterinary medicine, the flowering stems of Digitalis obscura were traditionally used to promote wound healing and treat toothaches in animals. It is one of twenty-three species traditionally used in Granada to treat trauma or poisoning in animals.

=== Toxicity ===
All parts of Digitalis obscura are poisonous if ingested raw, including the roots and seeds. The most potent parts of the plant are the upper leaves.

All foxgloves are highly toxic if eaten because they contain various cardiac glycosides such as digitoxin, digitalin, digitonin, digitalosmin, gitoxin and gitalonin. During digestion, aglycones and a sugar are released by the breakdown of these glycosides. The aglycones directly affect heart muscles and may slow the heart rate until cardiac arrest occurs.
