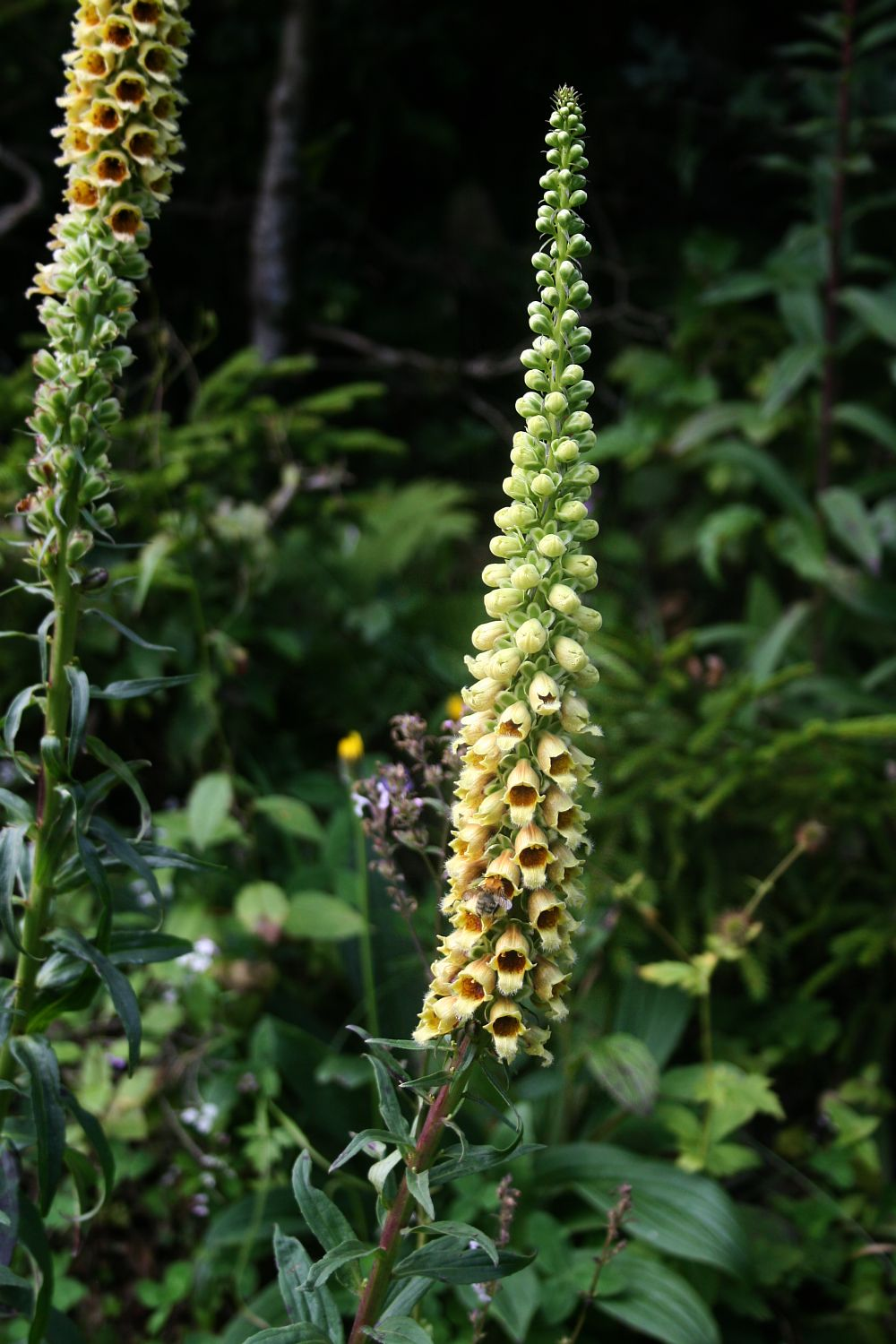

Scientific classification
- Kingdom: Plantae
- Clade: Embryophytes
- Clade: Tracheophytes
- Clade: Angiosperms
- Clade: Eudicots
- Clade: Asterids
- Order: Lamiales
- Family: Plantaginaceae
- Genus: Digitalis
- Species: D. ferruginea

Binomial name
- Digitalis ferruginea L.

= Digitalis ferruginea =

Species of flowering plant

Digitalis ferruginea, the rusty foxglove, is a species of flowering plant in the family Plantaginaceae, native to Hungary, Romania, Turkey and the Caucasus. It is a biennial or short-lived perennial plant growing to 1.2 metres (3 feet 11 inches) in height, which forms a rosette of oblong dark green leaves and carries spikes of russet, tubular flowers in summer.

The Latin specific epithet ferruginea means "rusty coloured", referring to the flowers.

As with all species of foxglove, all parts of this plant may cause severe discomfort and vomiting if eaten. Contact with the leaves may also cause an allergic reaction. This plant has gained the Royal Horticultural Society's Award of Garden Merit.
