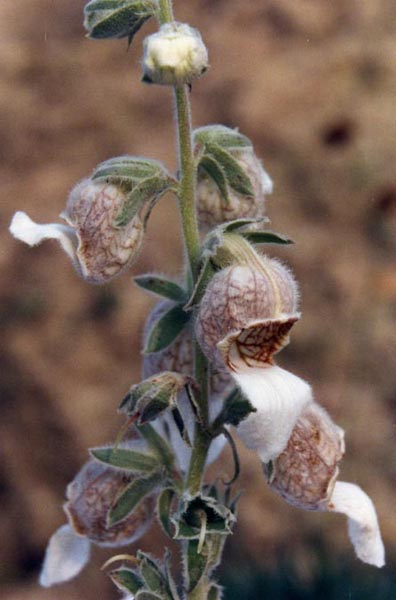
- Digitalis lamarckii showing flowers, note the white lip.

Scientific classification
- Kingdom: Plantae
- Clade: Tracheophytes
- Clade: Angiosperms
- Clade: Eudicots
- Clade: Asterids
- Order: Lamiales
- Family: Plantaginaceae
- Genus: Digitalis
- Species: D. lamarckii

Binomial name
- Digitalis lamarckii Ivanina

Synonyms
- Homotypic synonym: Digitalis cariensis subsp. lamarckii (K.V.Ivanova) K.Werner; Synonyms: Digitalis orientalis Lam.; Digitalis heldreichii Jaub. & Spach

= Digitalis lamarckii =

Species of flowering plant

Digitalis lamarckii is a species of flowering plant in family Plantaginaceae that is native to Turkey.

== Description ==
Digitalis lamarckii has basal leaves that are obovate to linear in shape and 5 to 20 cm (sometimes to 25 cm ) long and 3 to 13 mm wide. At the midpoint of the flowering stem, the leaves are 4 to 14 mm wide, linear or lanceolate shaped, and hairless. The flowers are arranged in to a raceme that is usually lax with the top of the inflorescence axis having pubescent hairs but hairless below. The corolla is 15 to 30 mm (sometimes to 35 mm) long. the lower lobe of the corolla is 7 to 14 mm long, linear to oblong-obovate in shape and narrowed below, it is whitish in color with light reddish-brown or yellowish-brown veins. The fruits are a capsule 10 to 20 mm long.
