= Geyik Mountains =

Mountain range in southern Turkey

Naming
- Native name: Geyik Dağları (Turkish)

Geography
- Parent range: Taurus Mountains

Geology
- Rock age(s): Cambrian and Tertiary

The Geyik Mountains (Turkish: Geyik Dağları) are a mountain range in the Taurus Mountains. The mountain range starts from the Dedegöl Mountains in the northeast of Antalya, extending up to the Taşeli Plateau, and ends in the point that separates the Western Taurus Mountains from the Central Taurus Mountains; forming the border between Antalya, Konya and Karaman.

The highest peak of Geyik Mountains is Mount Geyik (Geyik Dağı) at 2877 meters, located in the northeast of Gündoğmuş. Another notable peak, Sarıtaş Hill (Sarıtaş Tepesi) at 2339 meters, is located in the east of Gazipaşa.

The rocks of the Geyik Mountains were formed during Cambrian and Tertiary periods. Bauxit ores were sporadically formed in the system. The ore is excavated from the Seydişehir mine and refined in Seydişehir Aluminium Works (Seydişehir Alüminyum Tesisleri).

== Glaciation ==
The northeastern slopes of Geyik Mountains hold many cirques, all of which are formed on limestones. A few cirques also exist in other slopes as well. Glacial valleys are also commonly found, however they hold no glaciers. Small morains can be rarely encountered in the Geyik Mountains. Rock glacier exists in Mount Geyik, which is common throughout the Taurus.

== See also ==
- List of mountains in Turkey
- List of volcanoes in Turkey
