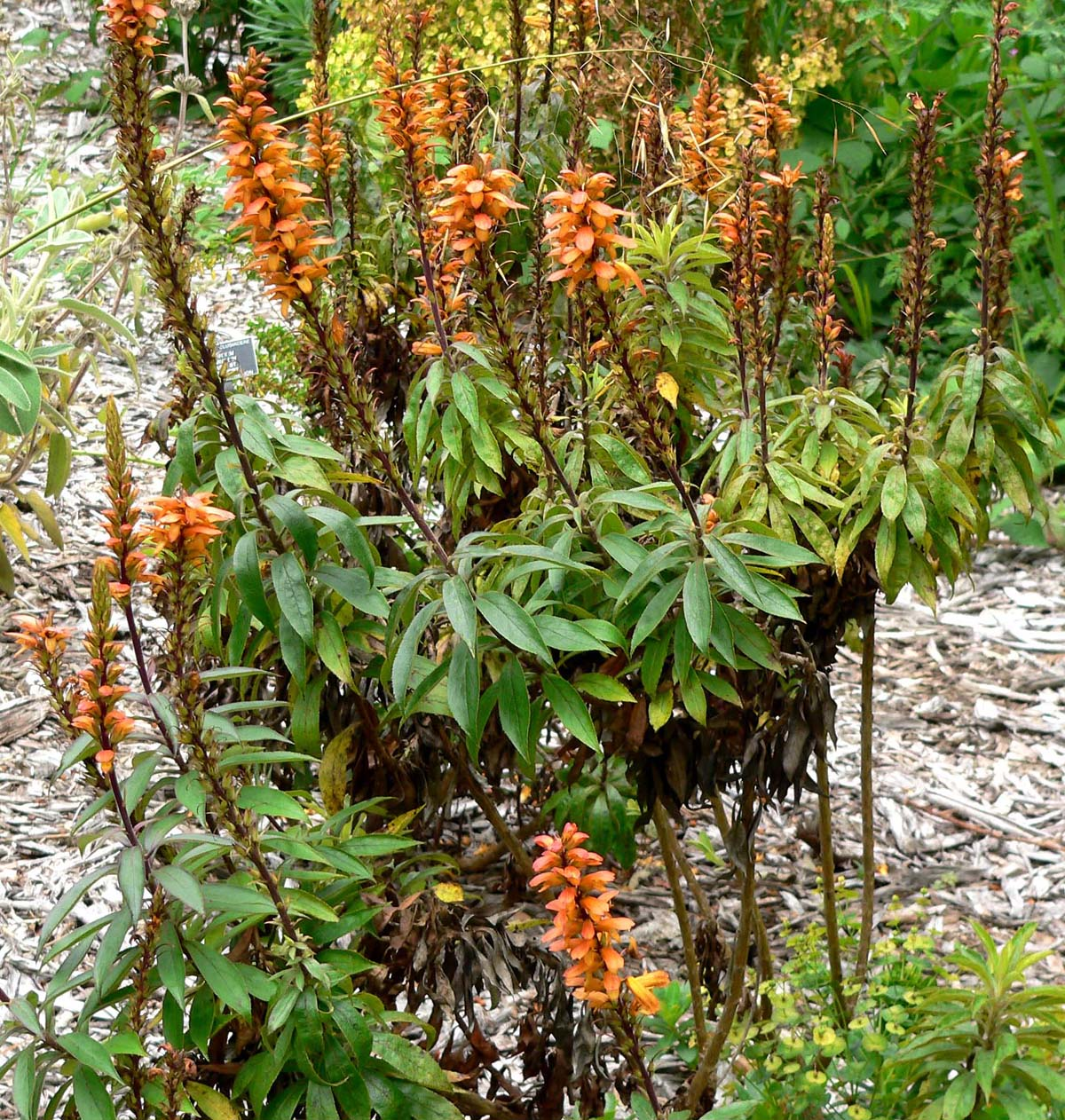
- Digitalis canariensis

Scientific classification
- Kingdom: Plantae
- Clade: Tracheophytes
- Clade: Angiosperms
- Clade: Eudicots
- Clade: Asterids
- Order: Lamiales
- Family: Plantaginaceae
- Genus: Digitalis
- Section: Digitalis sect. Isoplexis; Lindl.

= Digitalis sect. Isoplexis =

Section of flowering plants

Digitalis sect. Isoplexis is a section of four species of flowering plants within the genus Digitalis in the plantain family Plantaginaceae. The species of section Isoplexis differ from other plants in the genus Digitalis in that their monosymmetric (sometimes called zygomorphic) flowers have a distinctive large upper lip rather than large lower lip and the species are endemic to the Canary Islands (the species D. canariensis, D. chalcantha, and D. isabelliana) and Madeira (D. sceptrum).

== Taxonomy ==
Two Isoplexis species, D. canariensis and D. sceptrum, were first described by Carl Linnaeus in 1753 as part of the genus Digitalis. Since then the section has undergone several changes, the addition of two more species and more importantly being moved to a separate genus, under the genus name of Isoplexis or sometimes Callianassa, back and forth many times (Lindley 1821, Loudon 1829, Bentham 1835, Webb 1845, Wetstein 1891, Himmelbaeur and Zwillinger 1927, Werner 1960–1966, Heywood 1972). The position of Isoplexis as a section within Digitalis was finally proven by Carvalho in 1999 using molecular data and published by Brauchler et al. in 2004.

== Ecology ==
=== Habitat ===
Isoplexis species grow in woody habitats: D. canariensis in humid woodland areas and rarely in dry woodland areas, D. isabelliana in Pinus canariensis woodland and open disturbed areas, D. sceptrum in the cloud zone community Clethro-Laurion (Sjogren 1972) near streams on steep slopes, and D. chalcantha in Canary Island laurel forest.

=== Pollination ===
The flowers of Isoplexis species appear to be adapted for bird pollination. It was once thought that the original pollinators of Isoplexis and the other Canarian bird pollinated plants (such as members of the genera Canarina and Lotus) were sunbirds which had become extinct on the Canary Islands; this might explain why Isoplexis species are rare and considered endangered species (Vogel 1954; Vogel et al. 1984; Valido et al. 2004). However more recent work has shown that these plants are adequately pollinated by non-specialist flower visiting birds, particularly the Canary Islands chiffchaff (Phylloscopus canariensis), and the Canary Sardinian warbler (Sylvia melanocephala leucogastre) (Olesen 1985, Ollerton et al. 2008), and in fact show some specific adaptations to infrequent pollination by these birds, such as extended flower lifespans (Ollerton et al. 2008), and a hexose-dominated sugar ratio in the composition of the nectar (Dupont et al. 2004).

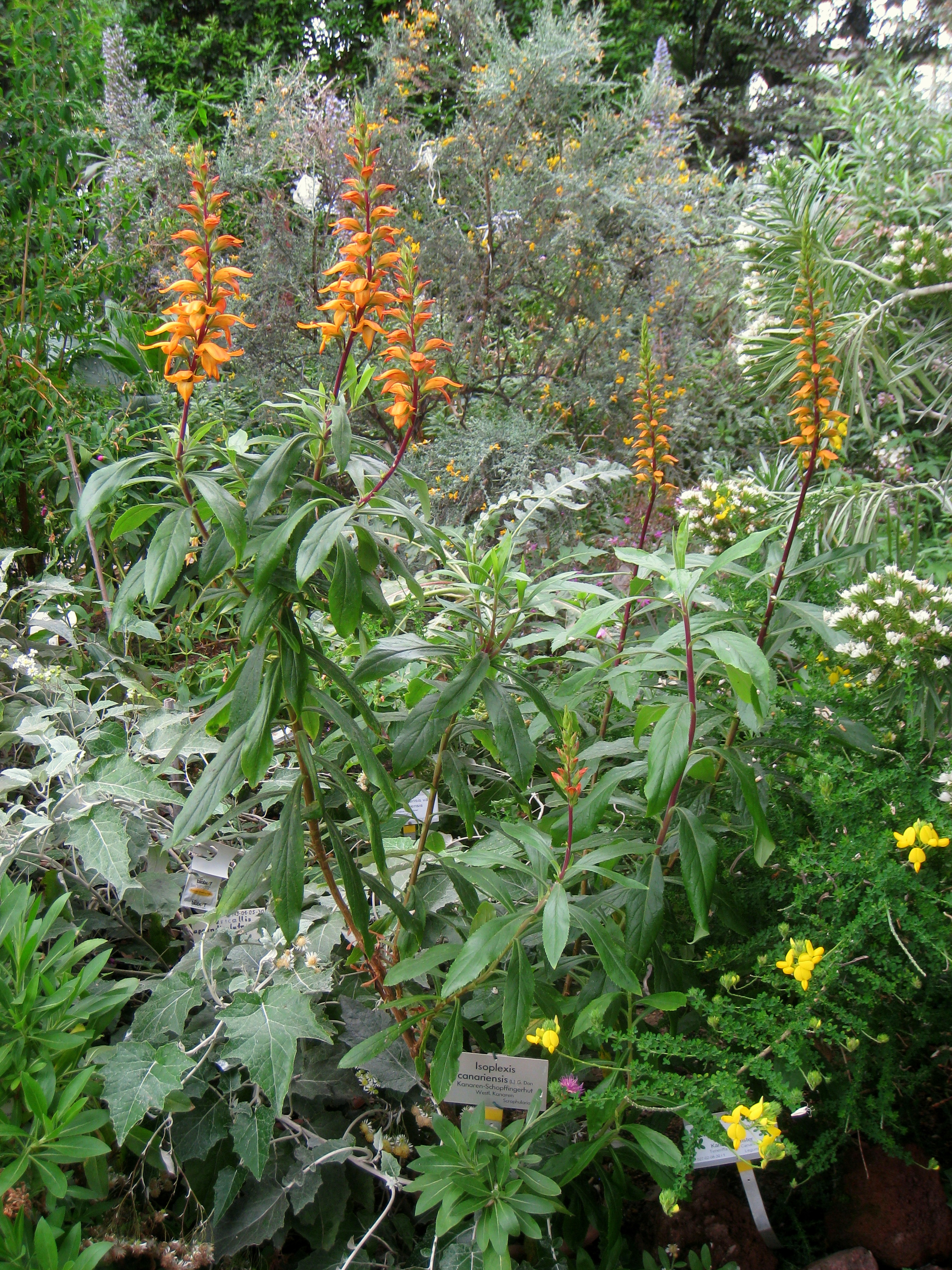
Digitalis (Isoplexis) canariensis

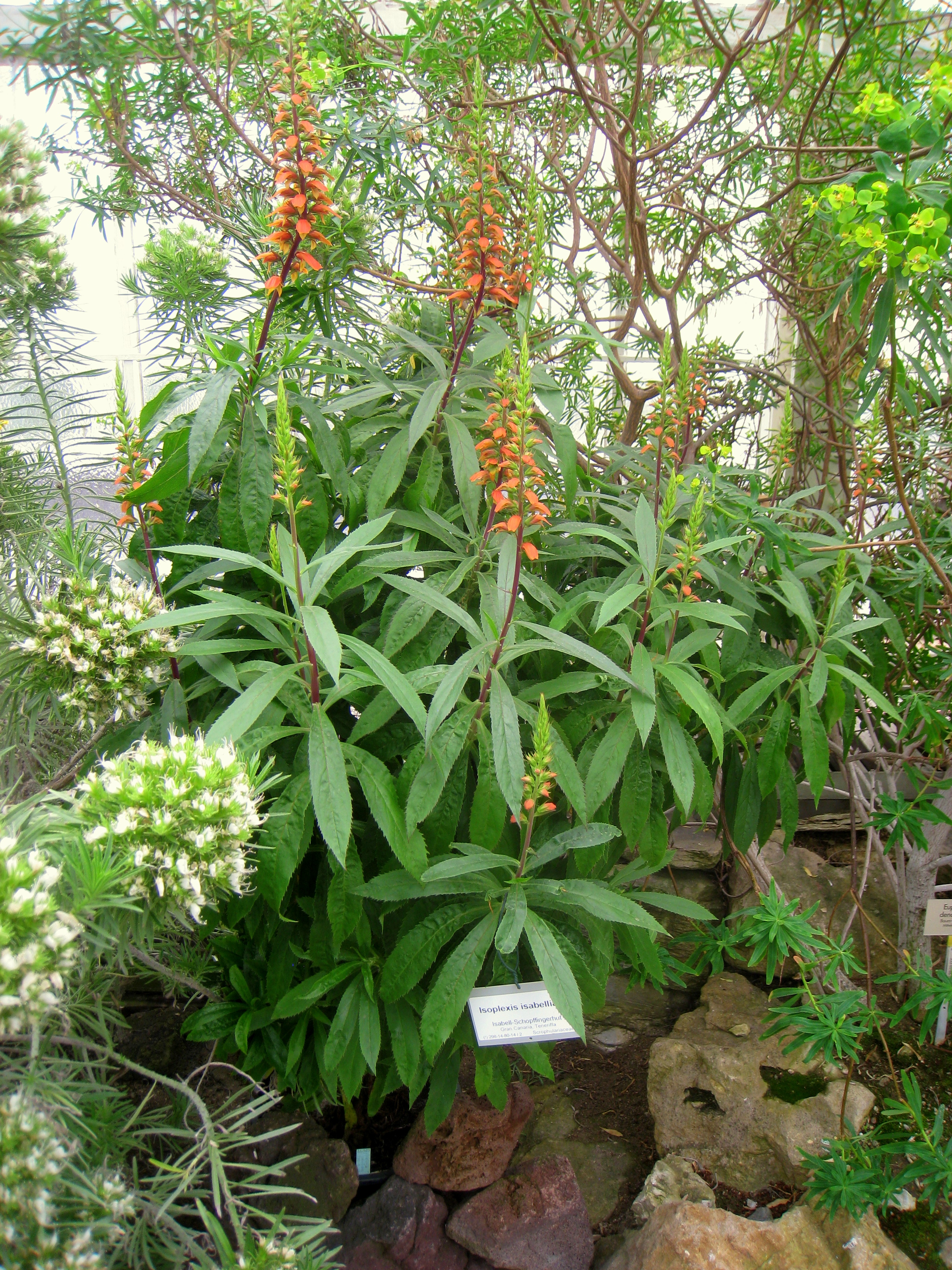
Digitalis (Isoplexis) isabelliana
