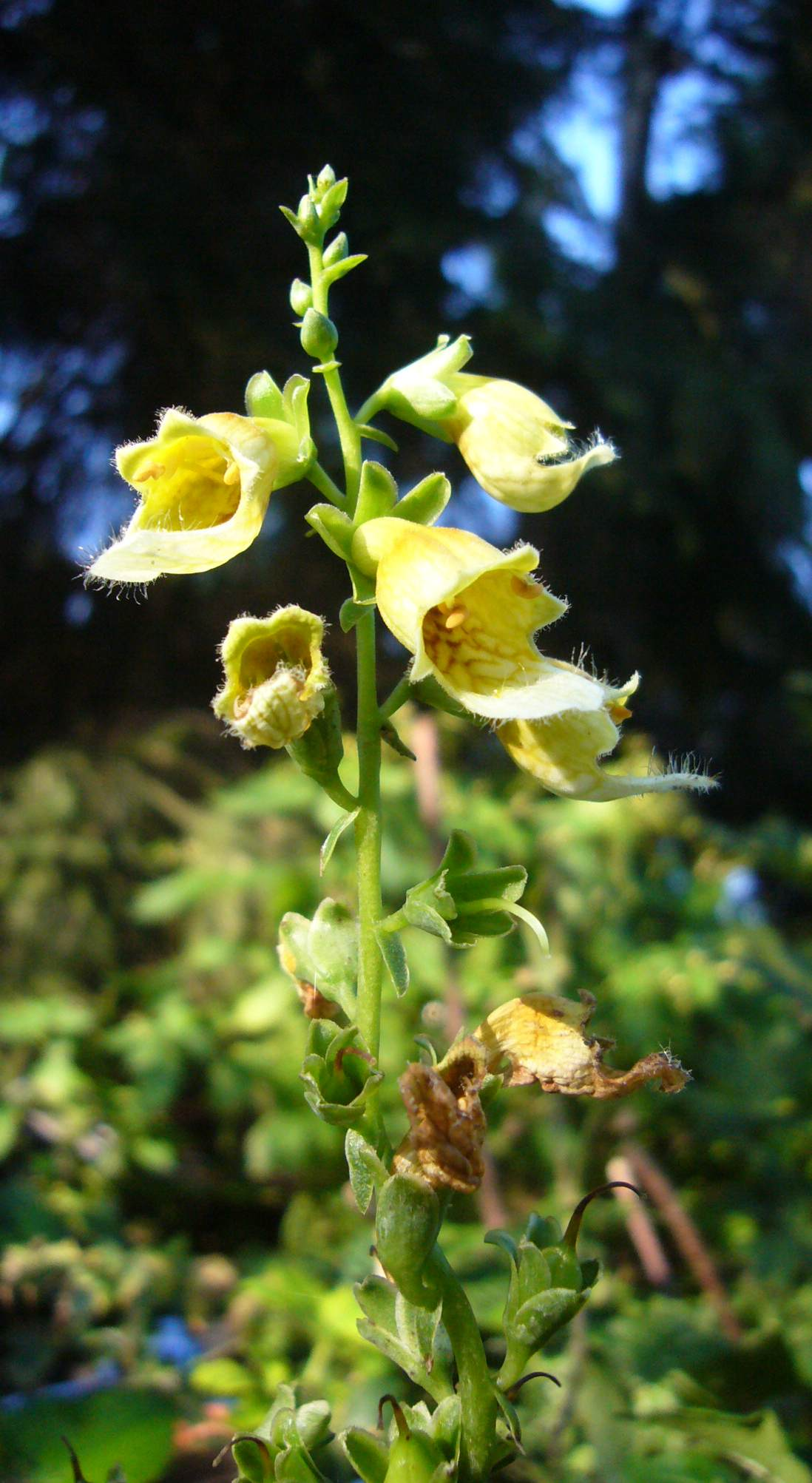

Scientific classification
- Kingdom: Plantae
- Clade: Tracheophytes
- Clade: Angiosperms
- Clade: Eudicots
- Clade: Asterids
- Order: Lamiales
- Family: Plantaginaceae
- Genus: Digitalis
- Species: D. nervosa

Binomial name
- Digitalis nervosa Steud. & Hochst. ex Benth.

Synonyms
- Digitalis laevigata C.A.Mey.; Digitalis nervosa Steud. & Hochst.

= Digitalis nervosa =

Species of flowering plant

Digitalis nervosa is a species of flowering plant in family Plantaginaceae. It is native to the Caucasus down to north western and northern Iran.

== Description ==
Digitalis nervosa are perennials from a woody rootstock, generally producing a single stem 30 to 80 cm tall with hairless (glabrous) foliage. The rosette leaves are entire, sessile, oblong-lanceolate in shape and 10 to 20 cm (sometimes to 30 cm) long and 2.5 to 5 cm (sometimes to 7 cm) wide. The leaves of the stem are sparsely distributed and 4 to 12 cm long. The flowers are 10 to 30 mm (sometimes to 50 mm) long, produced in a raceme. The corolla is coloured russet to yellow, and is bell-shaped, with slightly inflated tubes, and with glandular hairs along the margins. The filaments and pistil are hairless and the same length as the corolla tube, the anthers slightly surpass the tube on mature flowers. The fruits are a capsule 9 to 12mm long, ovate shaped with divergent lobes.

== Ecology ==
In the wild Digitalis nervosa flowers in July and August. This species is found growing in broad-leafed forests. It is hardy up to -20C.
