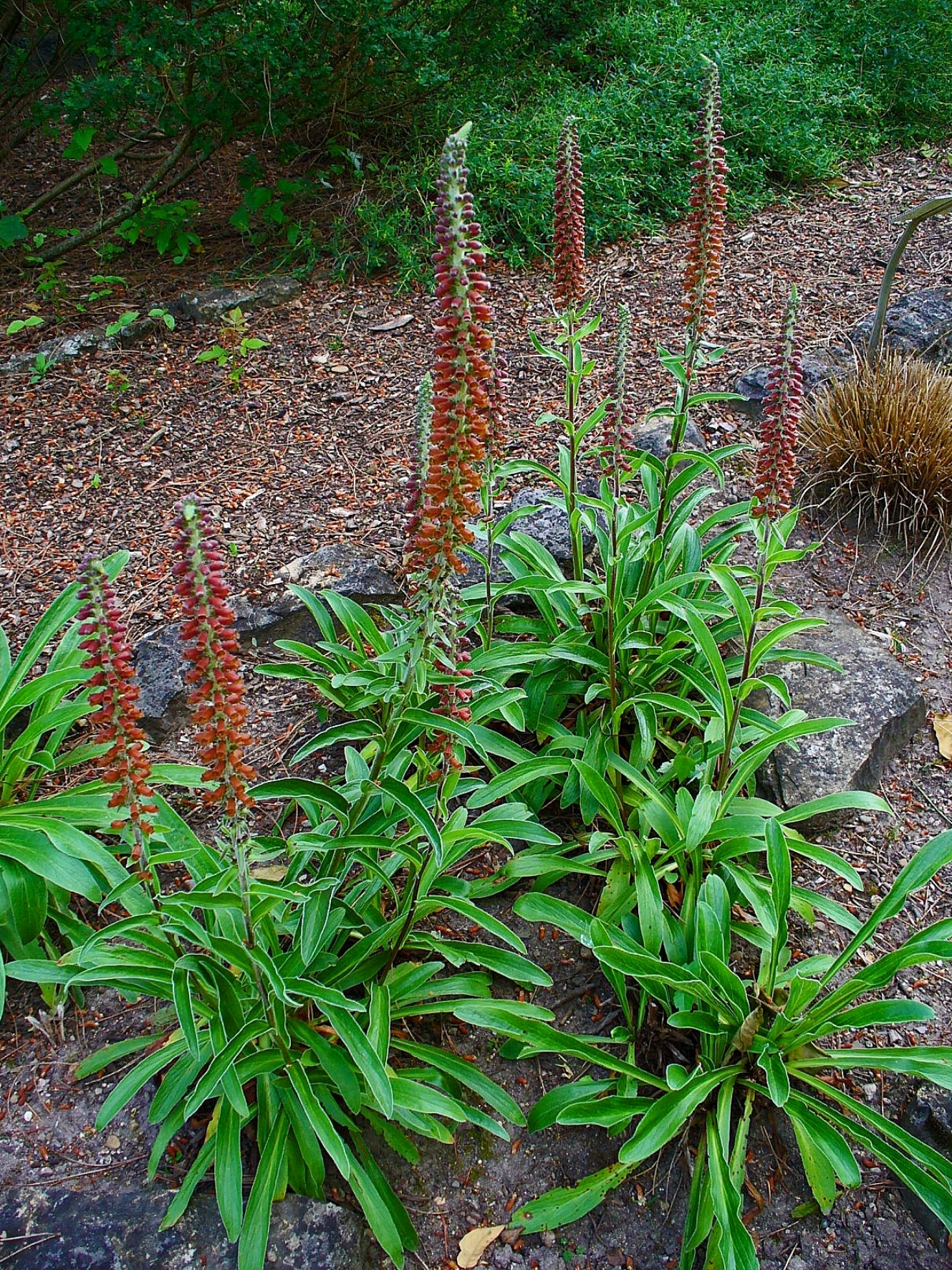

Scientific classification
- Kingdom: Plantae
- Clade: Tracheophytes
- Clade: Angiosperms
- Clade: Eudicots
- Clade: Asterids
- Order: Lamiales
- Family: Plantaginaceae
- Genus: Digitalis
- Species: D. parviflora

Binomial name
- Digitalis parviflora Jacq.

= Digitalis parviflora =

Species of foxglove

Digitalis parviflora, the small-flowered foxglove, is a species of flowering plant in the plantain family Plantaginaceae. It is endemic to northern and central Spain. It grows at (rarely 200-) 500–2000 metres in altitude.

It was first described as a species by Nikolaus Joseph von Jacquin in the first half of the 1770s. The Latin specific epithet parviflora means "with small flowers".

== Description ==
Digitalis parviflora is a short-lived herbaceous perennial or biennial. It grows to 60 cm (24 in). Spires of tubular rust-red flowers rise from downy rosettes of leaves in late spring and early summer.

== Uses ==
It is cultivated as an ornamental, preferring a semi-shaded position with damp soil. The species and the cultivar 'Milk Chocolate' have won the Royal Horticultural Society's Award of Garden Merit.
