= Digitalis cedretorum =

Scientific classification
- Kingdom: Plantae
- Clade: Tracheophytes
- Clade: Angiosperms
- Clade: Eudicots
- Clade: Asterids
- Order: Lamiales
- Family: Plantaginaceae
- Genus: Digitalis
- Species: D. cedretorum

Binomial name
- Digitalis cedretorum (Emb.) Maire

Synonyms
- Digitalis lutea subsp. cedretorum Emb.; Digitalis subalpina var. cedretorum (Emb.) Ivanina

Species of flowering plant

Digitalis cedretorum is a species of flowering plant in the family Plantaginaceae that is native to Morocco.

== Taxonomy ==
It was first described as Digitalis lutea subsp. cedretorum in 1936 by the French botanist Louis Emberger. Another French botanist, René Maire, raised it to an independent species four years later, 1940. It was first collected in a cedar woodland on a granite-derived substrate, at 2,500 metres in altitude in the eastern Atlas Mountains, north of a town called Masker.
