= Digitalis cariensis =

Scientific classification
- Kingdom: Plantae
- Clade: Tracheophytes
- Clade: Angiosperms
- Clade: Eudicots
- Clade: Asterids
- Order: Lamiales
- Family: Plantaginaceae
- Genus: Digitalis
- Species: D. cariensis

Binomial name
- Digitalis cariensis Boiss. ex Jaub. & Spach pro syn.

Synonyms
- Digitalis cariensis var. glandulosa Bornm.; Digitalis cariensis var. major K.Werner; Digitalis heldreichii Jaub. & Spach; Digitalis longibracteata Richt. ex Stapf

Species of flowering plant

Digitalis cariensis is a type of foxglove and part of a flowering plant species in the family Plantaginaceae, native to southwestern to southern Turkey.

In Muğla vilayet, it is locally known as yüksükotu, which generally means 'foxglove' in the Turkish language. A more specific name for this species is ishalotu, but the term may also be used for different plants.

== Taxonomy ==
A certain Chr. Pinard travelled twice to the region of Caria in the Ottoman Empire, first in 1842 and again in 1843. He collected plant specimens and sent them to Swiss botanist Alphonse de Candolle, who duly passed them on to the greatest expert of the flora of the Near and Middle East at the time, Pierre Edmond Boissier, also a Swiss botanist. As such Pinard collected the first scientific samples of the species Digitalis cariensis, as Boissier provisionally named it, in this region. Pinard sent a number of duplicates (especially in 1843), which could then be used to trade with other botanists to complete the knowledge of the region. Thus, a herbarium specimen found its way to the celebrated British taxonomist George Bentham who had undertaken to write the chapter on the Scrophulariaceae, published in 1846, in which the genus Digitalis was placed at the time, in the Prodromus systematis naturalis regni vegetabilis. It was an attempt to describe all of the plants of the world, begun by de Candolle's father. Boissier had not yet described the species, and Bentham was thus the first to publish the name D. cariensis, attributing the authorship to Boissier, and writing that the name was in litteris, meaning 'in unpublished correspondence'. He was, however, unconvinced that D. cariensis was a distinct species, and synonymised it with D. orientalis, and as such did not provide a description of the taxon. Thus Bentham's publication violates articles 34.1.a, 34.1.c, and 36.1 of the International Code of Botanical Nomenclature.

Digitalis cariensis was again published as a synonym of D. orientalis by the Frenchmen Hippolyte François Jaubert and Édouard Spach in their 1853 fifth volume of the Illustrationes Plantarum Orientalium, but unlike Bentham, they included a description of the taxon. This is thus the first valid publication of the name.

Digitalis orientalis, however, was a confused mess. It had first been described by the French biologist Jean-Baptiste Lamarck, but had also been used by the British botanist Philip Miller for another species. By the time of Jaubert and Spach, four different species had become lumped together under this name, and it was only in 1955 that the Russian botanist Lyudmila Ivanovna Ivanina finally teased apart the confusion.

== Description ==
Digitalis cariensis can grow up to 1.5m in height (in cultivation). It has linear basal leaves that gradually broaden to a blunt end that are 15 to 35 cm long and 4 to 13 mm wide. The lanceolate-shaped leaves halfway up the flowering stems are hairless (glabrous) and range from 6 to 18 mm wide. The flowers are arranged into a dense raceme with the inflorescence rachis having pubescent hairs above and hairless on the lower part. The flower corolla is 11 to 15 mm (sometimes to 17 mm) long. The lower lobe of the corolla is (3) 5 to 8 mm long, ovate to ovate-oblong in shape and not narrowed below. The lower lobe is yellowish to whitish in color with prominent reddish-brown veins. The fruits are a capsule 10 to 15 mm long.

== Distribution ==
Digitalis cariensis is endemic to the eastern Mediterranean region of Anatolia. It is found near Köyceğiz on Şandras dağı (mountain) in Muğla vilayet, and near Karaman in Karaman vilayet.

== Ecology ==
It is found in coniferous forests, oak woodland, on rocky slopes, and rarely on rock screes. It is known from an altitude of 800 to 1,700 metres.

It flowers in June to July in the wild, and July in Britain cultivations.

== Uses ==
It is quite uncommon in cultivation, but seeds are available commercially. It is grown in botanical gardens such as in Teplice (Botanická zahrada Teplice).

== Conservation ==
According to a study of the Turkish endemic species of Muğla vilayet, Digitalis cariensis was assessed as 'least concern' in the 2000 Red Data Book of Turkish Plants; this was updated to the version 3.1 IUCN Red List Categories of 2001 (also 'least concern') in the study.
