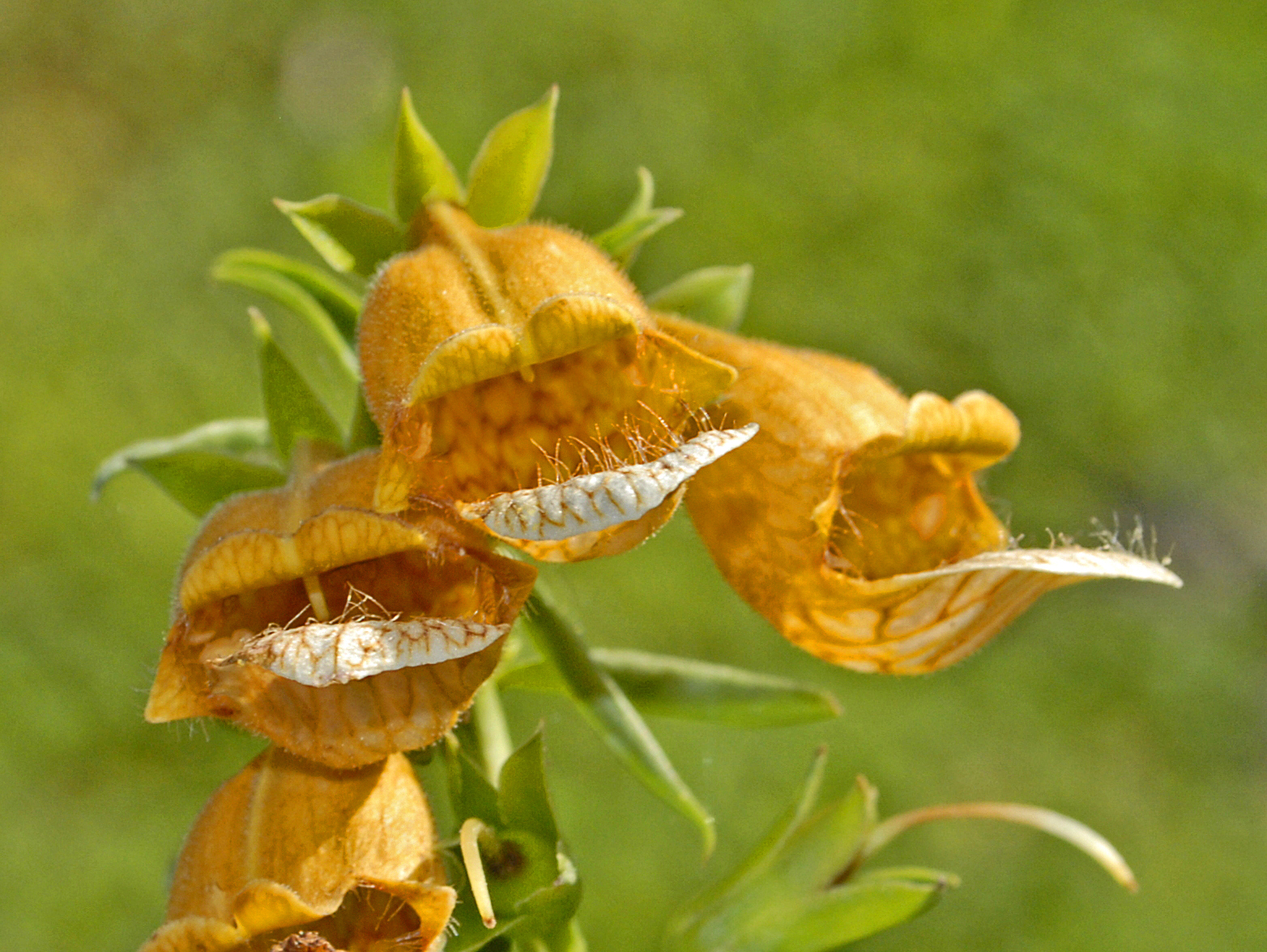
- Flowers of Digitalis laevigata subsp. laevigata at the Civico Orto Botanico di Trieste

Scientific classification
- Kingdom: Plantae
- Clade: Tracheophytes
- Clade: Angiosperms
- Clade: Eudicots
- Clade: Asterids
- Order: Lamiales
- Family: Plantaginaceae
- Genus: Digitalis
- Species: D. laevigata

Binomial name
- Digitalis laevigata Waldst. & Kit.

= Digitalis laevigata =

Species of foxglove

Digitalis laevigata, common names Grecian foxglove or giraffe foxglove, is a species of flowering plant in the genus Digitalis, in the family Plantaginaceae.

== Subspecies ==
- Digitalis laevigata subsp. graeca (Ivanina) Werner
- Digitalis laevigata subsp. laevigata Waldst. & Kit.

== Description ==
Digitalis laevigata grows to about 70–90 centimetres (28–35 in) in height. This perennial herbaceous plant has erect stems with lance-shaped leaves, while basal leaves are oblong to ovate. It produces spires of orange, umber or yellow bell-shaped flowers with a large whitish lower lip and purple veined, speckled interiors. It blooms from May to July.

== Distribution ==
This species is native to southern Europe. It grows wild in the Balkans.
