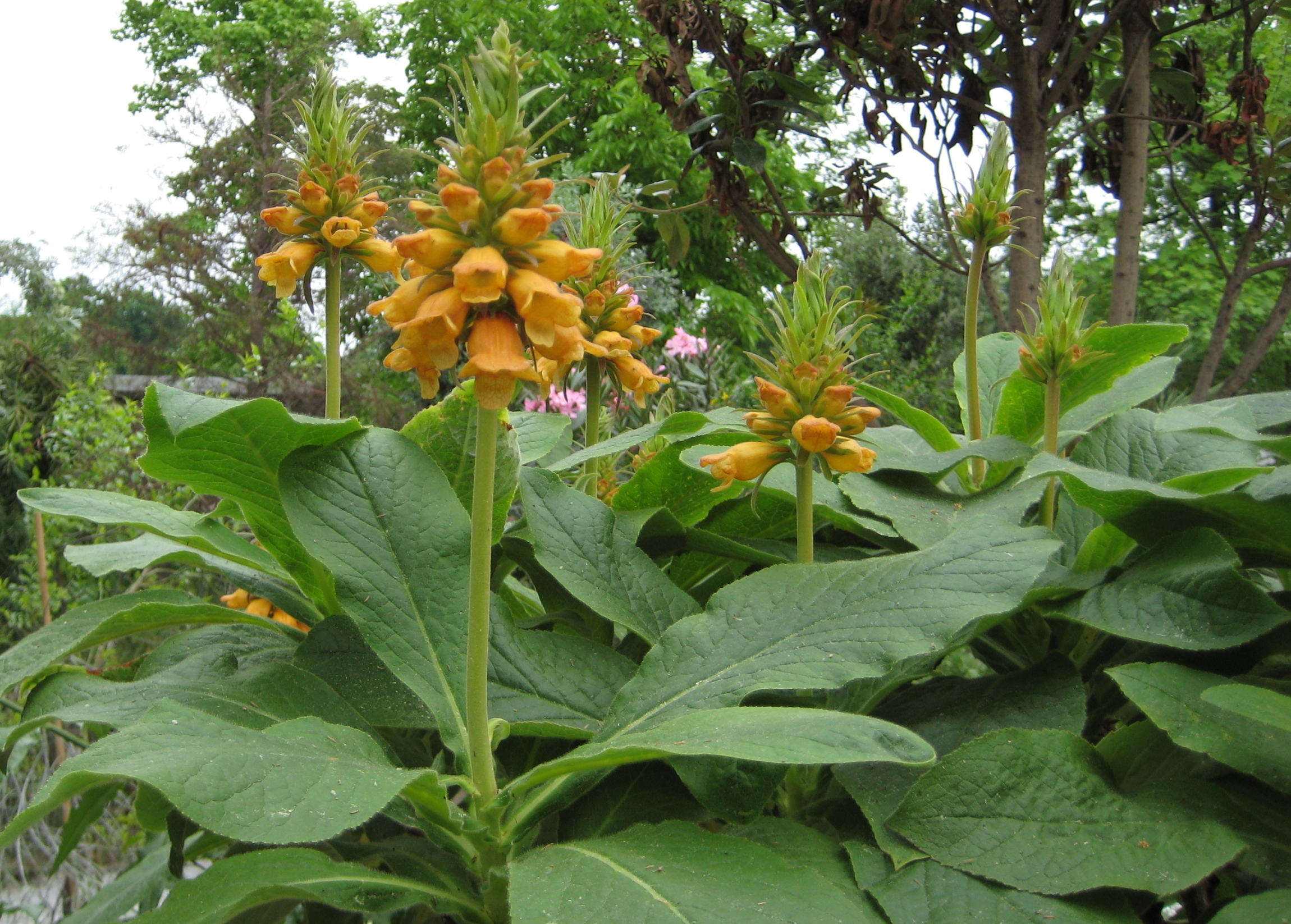

Scientific classification
- Kingdom: Plantae
- Clade: Embryophytes
- Clade: Tracheophytes
- Clade: Spermatophytes
- Clade: Angiosperms
- Clade: Eudicots
- Clade: Asterids
- Order: Lamiales
- Family: Plantaginaceae
- Genus: Digitalis
- Species: D. sceptrum

Binomial name
- Digitalis sceptrum L.f.

Synonyms
- Digitalis regalis Salisb. Digitalis macrostachya St. Lag. Digitalis comosa R. Br. ex Britten; Callianassa sceptrum f. webb

= Digitalis sceptrum =

Species of foxglove

Digitalis sceptrum (common names; sceptre foxglove, bush foxglove or Madeiran foxglove) is a species of Digitalis from Madeira.

== Description ==
Digitalis sceptrum (previously known as isoplexis sceptrum) is a tender evergreen shrub in the foxglove family, growing up to 1.8m. high. Leaves are toothed and oblong or ovate in shape; flowers consist of racemes of yellow, orange or tawny russet, often netted with chocolate-brown, appearing in summer. Digitalis sceptrum prefers wooded habitats, cloud forests and steep slopes, often near water. It may take up to five years to reach full flowering maturity.
