= Peter Hadland Davis =

English botanist

- Born: 18 June 1918; Weston-super-Mare, England
- Died: 5 March 1992 (aged 73); Edinburgh, Scotland

Peter Hadland Davis FLS, FRSE (18 June 1918 – 5 March 1992) was a British botanist, specialist in the flora of Turkey, plant collector and a professor at University of Edinburgh.

== Early life and education ==
Davis was born on 18 June 1918 in Weston-super-Mare. Initially he was educated at the Nash House, Burnham-on-Sea and then continued his education at Bradfield College and later in Maiden Erlegh near Reading, Berkshire. He had a stammer that continued throughout his life. In 1937 he began training at Ingwersen's Alpine Plant Nursery in East Grinstead and became interested in botany.

In 1938 he began his first botanical expedition, albeit as an amateur on his own initiative. He visited the Middle East and Turkey, but had to break off his trip in 1939 at the beginning of World War II. He was called up into the army and served until 1945. The last two years of his time in the army he spent time in Cairo. He became interested in the plants of the North Africa and South West Asia. Immediately after he was demobbed, Davis moved to Scotland to study botany and biology at the University of Edinburgh and was awarded a first class degree.

== Career ==
He was appointed to the staff of University of Edinburgh in 1950, and promoted to a personal chair as Professor of Taxonomic Botany in 1979. He was based in the Royal Botanic Garden Edinburgh, as an honorary curator, but also taught in degrees from the University of Edinburgh. In 1950 he began the research project that eventually became the Flora of Turkey and the East Aegean Islands and was part supported by government grants. In 1952 he received his PhD on Taxonomy of Middle East flora. In the 1950s, Davis made many overseas trips, collecting plants in Kurdistan, Russia and the Middle East. In 1959 he was honoured with the Cuthbert Peek Award of the Royal Geographical Society for his expedition to Kurdistan.

In 1955 he was elected a Fellow of the Royal Society of Edinburgh. His proposers were Sir William Wright Smith, Alexander Nelson, John Anthony and Brian Burtt.

From 1961 he intensified his efforts to complete the Flora of Turkey, which was finally completed in 1985 after 11 expeditions to Turkey and North Africa and collecting around 28,500 specimens. It was published in 10 volumes with the Flora of Turkey Supplement in 1989. In 1963 he was awarded a D.Sc. qualification from the University of Edinburgh for the thesis Contributions to the flora of Turkey. He was invited to serve as regional adviser for Turkey on the Flora Europaea project. He was awarded the Symposium Medal during the International Symposium on the Problems of Balkan Flora and Vegetation, and was honoured by the Turkish government for his outstanding achievements in science. He later received the Gold Medal of the Linnean Society of London for his commitment to the Royal Botanic Garden Edinburgh. In the 1980s, he was awarded the Neill Medal of the Royal Society of Edinburgh for his contributions to plant taxonomy.

== Other interests ==
Davis was not only a plant collector but a collector of pottery and modern art. There was an exhibition of his modern art collection at the Scottish National Gallery of Modern Art in 1964. He had a notable collection of Wemyss Ware, a handpainted earthenware made in Kirkcaldy from 1830-1930. In 1986 he jointly published an illustrated work which detailed the history of the pottery and its artists: Wemyss Ware: A Decorative Scottish Pottery.

== Legacy ==
He died in Edinburgh, 5 March 1992. Under the terms of his will he endowed the Davis Expedition Fund, to assist Edinburgh students to undertake biological fieldwork abroad, as he had done. He also provided money to support writing a Flora of Morocco. Among the material from his personal herbarium of around 50,000 plant specimens, the specimens from Turkey are now in the herbarium of Royal Botanic Garden, Edinburgh along with a collection of his personal papers. Many of his pieces of Wemyss Ware are now in the collection of the National Museums Scotland.

== Publications ==
He was the co-author of Principles of Angiosperm Taxonomy (1991) and The Identification of Flowering Plant Families (1989, with J. Cullen).

The plant taxa Biarum davisii, Symphytum davisii, Atriplex davisii, Vicia davisii, Fritillaria davisii, Digitalis davisiana, Papaver davisii and Alopecurus davisii are named after him.

== Selected works ==
- Peter H. Davis (ed.). Flora of Turkey and the East Aegean Islands. Edinburgh University Press. (ten volumes)
- Peter H. Davis; V. H. Heywood (1963). Principles of Angiosperm Taxonomy. Oliver & Boyd.
- Peter H. Davis; J. Cullen (1989). The Identification of Flowering Plant Families: Including a Key to Those Cultivated in North Temperate Regions. Cambridge University Press.
- Peter H. Davis; P. C. Harper; I. C. Hedge (1971). Plant life of South-West Asia.
- Peter H. Davis; R. Rankine (1986). Wemyss Ware: A Decorative Scottish Pottery. Scottish Academic Press.
