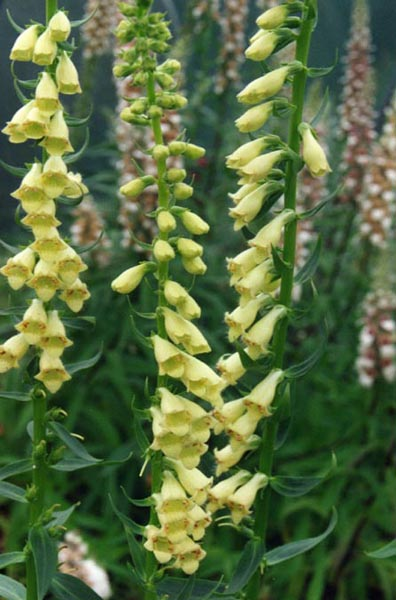
- Digitalis viridiflora flowering

Scientific classification
- Kingdom: Plantae
- Clade: Tracheophytes
- Clade: Angiosperms
- Clade: Eudicots
- Clade: Asterids
- Order: Lamiales
- Family: Plantaginaceae
- Genus: Digitalis
- Species: D. viridiflora

Binomial name
- Digitalis viridiflora Lindl.

= Digitalis viridiflora =

Species of plant

Digitalis viridiflora is a species of flowering plant commonly called green foxglove in family Plantaginaceae. It is a perennial species with greenish-yellow flowers produced on stems that grow 60 cm (23.6 in) to 80 cm (31.5 in) tall. It is native to the Balkans. It is found growing in woodlands and on heaths.

== Description ==
Digitalis viridiflora is a herbaceous, perennial foxglove, growing up to 80 cm (31.5 in)cm tall. It has upright flowering stems with many greenish-yellow flowers that have some brownish-red spotting and mottling of the throats. The foliage is covered with pubescent hairs (trichomes). It has 56 chromosomes.

== Distribution ==
It is native to Albania, Bulgaria, Greece, Thrace (Turkey), and areas within the region of the former Yugoslavia.

== Cultivation ==
Green foxglove is a perennial grown in gardens for its distinctive greenish-yellow flower color and it being adaptable to partial shade; it has a dense habit and the flowering stems make long-lasting cut flowers. It is propagated by seed and by division of plants in early spring.
