= Seydişehir mine =

Bauxite mine in Turkey

- Location: Seydişehir, Konya Province, Turkey
- Products: Bauxite
- Opened: 1968
- Company: Etibank

The Seydişehir mine is a large mine in the south of Turkey in Konya Province, 361 km south of the capital, Ankara. Seydişehir is situated on one of the largest veins of bauxite in Turkey, with estimated reserves of 30 million tonnes of bauxite.
