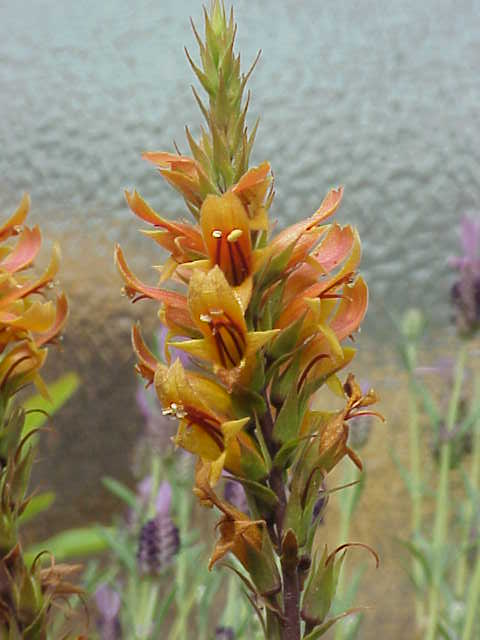
- Digitalis isabelliana

Conservation status
- Endangered (IUCN 3.1)

Scientific classification
- Kingdom: Plantae
- Clade: Embryophytes
- Clade: Tracheophytes
- Clade: Spermatophytes
- Clade: Angiosperms
- Clade: Eudicots
- Clade: Asterids
- Order: Lamiales
- Family: Plantaginaceae
- Genus: Digitalis
- Section: Isoplexis
- Species: D. isabelliana

Binomial name
- Digitalis isabelliana (Webb) Linding.

Synonyms
- Callianassa isabelliana Webb; Digitalis canariensis var. isabelliana (Webb) Linding.; Isoplexis isabelliana (Webb) Mansf.

= Digitalis isabelliana =

Species of plant in the foxglove family

Digitalis isabelliana, known commonly as Canary Island foxglove, Isabel's foxglove, or Gran Canaria Pineforest foxglove, is a type of flowering shrub, one of three species of foxglove native to the Canary Islands.

== Description ==
Digitalis isabelliana is a broadleaf evergreen perennial shrub, growing up to 1.5 m (4 ft 11 in) in height, with a much-branched woody base. The leaves are broadly ovate, dark green, glabrous, and with a serrated margin. The flowers are russet, orange or terracotta in colour, with long, beak-shaped hoods, and grow in long spikes.

== Distribution and habitat ==
Digitalis isabelliana grows primarily in the subtropical biome of the Canary Islands, where it is endemic to Gran Canaria, where it occurs on the moister northeast and centre of the island, favouring the undergrowth beneath stands of Canary Islands pine. In the wild it favours damp and wooded areas.

== Conservation ==
Digitalis isabelliana is considered an endangered species due to diminishing habitat, with few large colonies.
