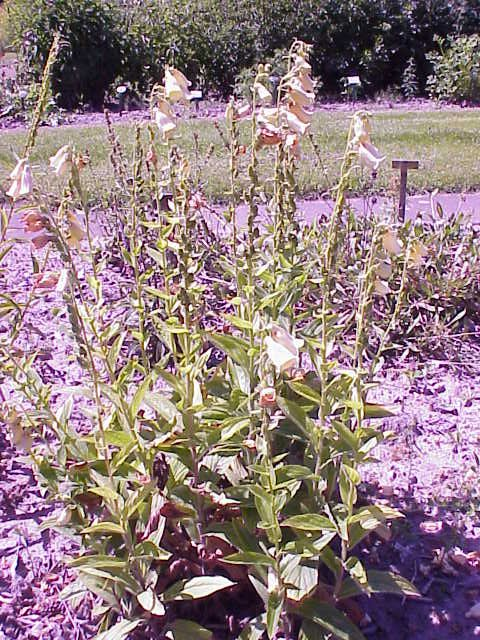

Scientific classification
- Kingdom: Plantae
- Clade: Tracheophytes
- Clade: Angiosperms
- Clade: Eudicots
- Clade: Asterids
- Order: Lamiales
- Family: Plantaginaceae
- Genus: Digitalis
- Species: D. ciliata

Binomial name
- Digitalis ciliata Trautv.

= Digitalis ciliata =

Species of plant

Digitalis ciliata, commonly called hairy foxglove is a member of the genus Digitalis. It has thimble-shaped, yellow to cream-colored flowers produced on perennial plants with evergreen foliage. It is native to the Caucasus and is grown as an ornamental plant in other parts of the world. The species name is derived from the fine hairs that cover the plant's stems and flowers.

== Description ==
Individuals of these species are herbs that grow from anywhere between 30 cm and 60 cm tall. They have an alternate leaf pattern with small, green, lanceolate leaves that are known for both their medicinal purposes and high toxicity when ingested. The flowers are located at the terminal ends of the stems, and are arranged in a inflorescence pattern known as a 'raceme'.

=== Flowers and fruit ===
The flowers of Digitalis ciliata are a distinguishing feature that gave the entire genus its name, as it has a campanulate structure that also resembles a thimble and fits on the tip of the finger. The perianth has five parts and the color of the corolla is a pale-yellow. The species epithet, ciliata, is indicative of the tiny "hairs" that are apparent on the upper and lower lips of the corolla. There are also tiny hairs that cover the leaves of the plant. The fruit is a capsule.

== Distribution ==
Digitalis ciliata is native to the Caucasus area.

== Ecology ==
Digitalis ciliata can be found in meadows, pastures, in the margins of forests, and also on slopes, as it is indigenous to mountainous terrain.

== Uses ==
=== Horticulture ===
It can also be grown throughout the world where there is warm enough weather and well-drained yet moist soil. It can be grown as an ornamental plant in both Europe and North America.

=== Medicinal ===
Digitalis ciliata is used to isolate cardenolide glycolosides and is abundant in basically all of the glycosides that the Digitalis genus is known for. These common glycosides include digitoxigenin, gitoxigenin, digoxigenin, gitaloxigenin, and diginatigenin.

The seeds of D. ciliata are rich in the steroid glycoside digitonin, along with other lipids that are important in cardiac treatments.

Not only is D. ciliata useful in the cardiac sector of medicine, but its anti-proliferative roles are also being looked into for its possible role in suppressing tumors. There may be evidence that the saponins found in this species have an anti-tumor effect by aiding in cell cycle arrest and cell death, or apoptosis.
