= Digitalis atlantica =

Scientific classification
- Kingdom: Plantae
- Clade: Tracheophytes
- Clade: Angiosperms
- Clade: Eudicots
- Clade: Asterids
- Order: Lamiales
- Family: Plantaginaceae
- Genus: Digitalis
- Species: D. atlantica

Binomial name
- Digitalis atlantica Pomel

Species of plant

Digitalis atlantica is a perennial foxglove species in the family Plantaginaceae. It is native to Algeria.

== Description ==
Digitalis atlantica is a biennial or perennial herb. The plant leaves grow in the shape of a rosette until flowering stems develop in the second year. Leaves are downy, finely wrinkled on the upper surface and grey-green. The leaves are ovate, with toothed edges, and may measure up to 25cm long. The flowering stem can grow up to 2m tall, with flowers in a tall spike during the flowering period of spring to summer.

== Toxicity ==
Like all species in the Digitalis genus, Digitalis atlantica is also toxic. However, this particular species seems to have the lowest cardenolide content.
