= Will Ingwersen =

Will Ingwersen

Will Alfred Theodore Ingwersen (7 May 1905 – 14 June 1990), was a British nurseryman and alpine specialist. He was an authority on alpine plants, and an expert on rock gardens.

Ingwersen was awarded numerous gold medals at the Chelsea Flower Show and was the author or co-author of several books. On occasion, he served as a broadcaster on the BBC's Gardeners' Question Time. The nursery founded by his father ceased to trade in November 2008 when his half-brother Paul retired.

Ingwersen was a past president of Horticultural Trades Association, and vice-president of both the Alpine Garden Society and the Royal Horticultural Society.

== Bibliography ==
- Alpine Garden Plants (1981)
- Alpines (1992) Saga Press/Timber Press Inc. (Portland, OR)
- Alpines Without a Rock Garden (1971)
- Alpine and Rock Plants (1983)
- Classic Garden Plants (1975) ISBN 0600339408
- Manual of Alpine Plants (1978) First published by Ingwersen and Dunnsprint (UK)
- Rock Garden and Alpine Plants
- The Dianthus: A Flower Monograph
