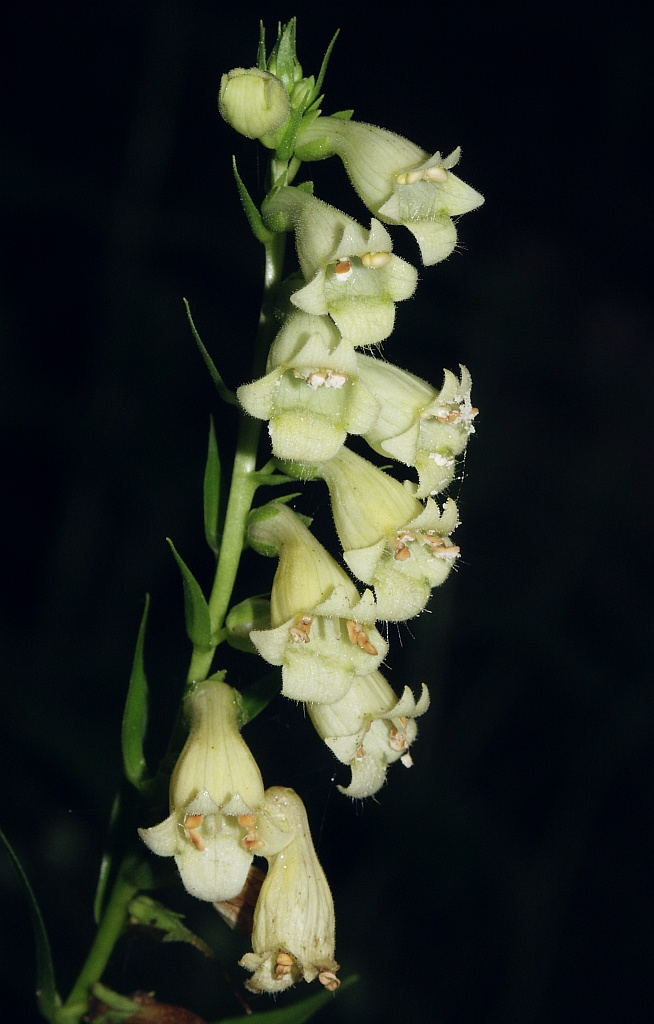

Scientific classification
- Kingdom: Plantae
- Clade: Tracheophytes
- Clade: Angiosperms
- Clade: Eudicots
- Clade: Asterids
- Order: Lamiales
- Family: Plantaginaceae
- Genus: Digitalis
- Species: D. lutea

Binomial name
- Digitalis lutea L.

= Digitalis lutea =

Species of foxglove

Digitalis lutea, the straw foxglove or small yellow foxglove, is a species of flowering plant in the plantain family Plantaginaceae, that is native to western and southern Europe and North West Africa.

== Description ==
A short-lived herbaceous perennial or biennial, it grows to 1 m (3.3 ft) tall. Spikes of tubular pale-yellow flowers with brown spots on the inside of the corolla, rise in late spring and early summer, from rosettes of leaves. Flowers may appear sporadically throughout the summer into autumn.

Like many foxgloves, this plant is often grown in gardens, where it readily self-sows and can become weedy. It has received the Royal Horticultural Society's Award of Garden Merit.

Like all foxgloves, the plant is toxic if ingested.
