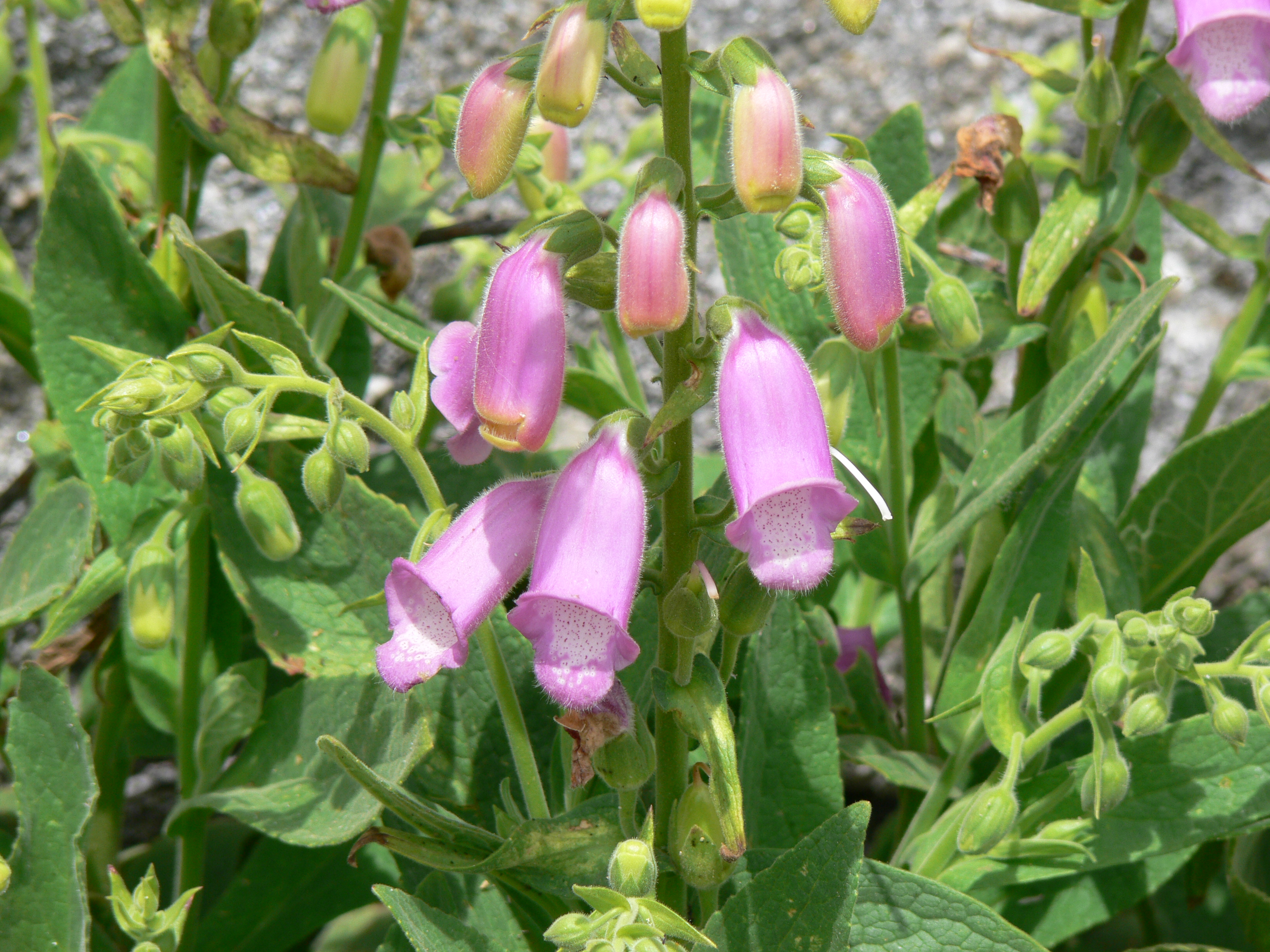
- Digitalis thapsi in situ at Villavieja de Yeltes, Salamanca, Spain

Scientific classification
- Kingdom: Plantae
- Clade: Tracheophytes
- Clade: Angiosperms
- Clade: Eudicots
- Clade: Asterids
- Order: Lamiales
- Family: Plantaginaceae
- Genus: Digitalis
- Species: D. thapsi

Binomial name
- Digitalis thapsi L.

Synonyms
- Homotypic: Digitalis purpurea proles thapsi ((L.) Font Quer in Bol. Farm. Militar 3: 128. 1925.); Digitalis purpurea subsp. thapsi ((L.) Font Quer, Pl. Medic. 619. 1962, comb. inval.); Digitalis purpurea subsp. thapsi ((L.) Rivas Goday in Farmacogn. 5: 144. 1946.); Heterotypic: Digitalis thapsi f. albiflora (C.Vicioso, in sched., nom. nud.); Digitalis thapsi f. albiflora (C.Vicioso ex R.Fern. in Mem. Soc. Brot. 6: 50. 1950.)

= Digitalis thapsi =

Species of foxglove

Digitalis thapsi, which has been called mullein foxglove in the US, is a flowering plant in the genus Digitalis that is endemic to the Iberian Peninsula, where it occurs in eastern Portugal and central and western Spain. It is of commercial importance as an ornamental plant. Hybrids with D. purpurea have proved successful and are fertile.

== Names ==
A Missouri Botanical Garden website calls it mullein foxglove. Local vernacular names recorded for this species are abeloura, abeloura-amarelada, aboleira, aveloeira, dedaleira, luvas de Santa María, pegajo and rabo de raposa in Portuguese, whereas in Spanish the most common name is dedalera, followed by viloria, viluria, giloria, dedales and mataperla, but it has also been called abiloria, abiluria, abortones, bacera, beleño, biloria, biluria, campanilla, cascante, cascaor, chupadera, chupamieles, chupera, cohete, cohetera, cohetes, deales, dedales de niño, dedales purpúreos, dediles, digital, digitalis, emborrachacabras, estallones, goldaperra, guadalperra, gualdaperra, guardaperros, hueltaperra, mata de lagartija, mataperros, rabera, ravera, raéra, restalladera, restralleti, restrallos, sabia, tuercecuellos and vueltaperra.

== Taxonomy ==
It was first described in the modern taxonomic system by Carl Linnaeus in 1763.

The genus Digitalis was formerly assigned to the family Scrophulariaceae, but it is now considered to belong within the Plantaginaceae.

=== Hybrids ===
Joseph Gottlieb Kölreuter, a German botanist, observed that D. thapsi had many characteristics of D. purpurea after four to five generations of cultivation, and that the former became indistinguishable from the latter, a report that was considered "probably" trustworthy by Charles Darwin. D. thapsi and D. purpurea hybrids are generally fertile.

In many areas of Spain and Portugal populations of D. thapsi and D. purpurea meet, and introgression is common. These have been known as D. purpurea nothosubsp. carpetana and D. minor in error in two older Portuguese works (1906, 1913), but this hybrid is now generally known as D. × coutinhoi.

== Description ==
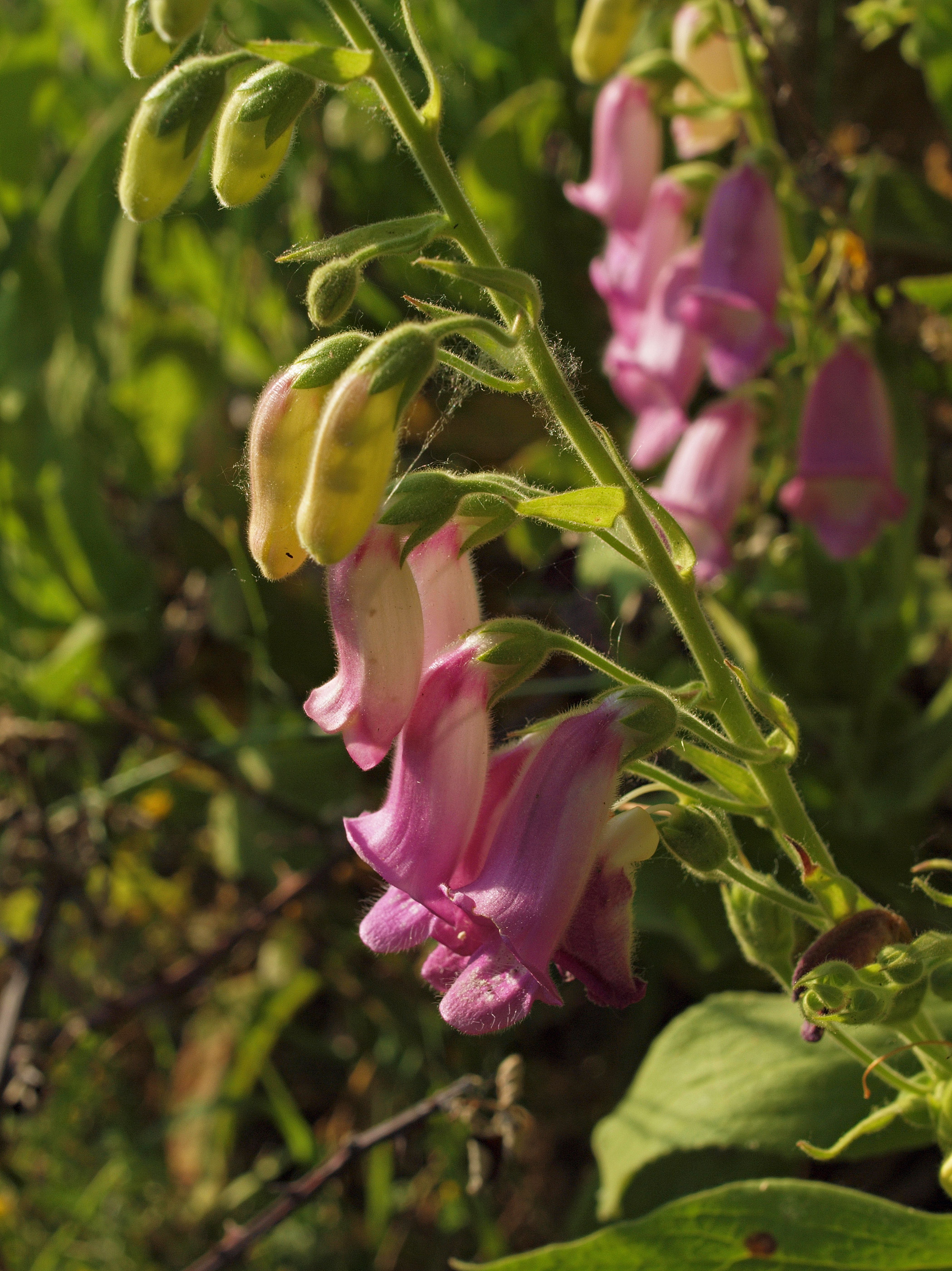
Growing in its native Spain

=== Habitus ===
Digitalis thapsi is a perennial plant. Its yellow-green leaves are ovate to oblong in shape and decurrent, with winged bases. The flowers, stems and leaves are covered with a dense indumentum of tiny hairs, giving them a soft appearance. These yellow-green hairs (trichomes) are exclusively glandular. The entire plant is very sticky (glutinose). It is caespitose, meaning it grows with its large leaves tightly arranged into one, or a number, of rosettes growing at or just above ground level. In older plants the base becomes woody and highly branched at ground level, so that a single plant has multiple rosettes. The green, round to slightly angular stems grow to (30-)50 to 80(-100)cm in height before they start to flower. The stems are similarly entirely covered in glandular hairs; these are present in two forms: short and subsessile, or much longer, 0.4 to 0.6mm.

The chromosome count is 2n=56.

=== Leaves ===
The lower basal leaf blades are 7.5 to 13 cm (exceptionally 19 cm) in length, 2.5 to 5 cm in width, more or less flat but sometimes undulated along the margins, and oblong to elliptic in shape, with a sharp to somewhat sharply tipped apex. The bases of the leaves taper gradually into the petioles. The texture is soft, not leathery. The underside is rugose-reticular in texture, coloured greenish-yellow and very densely packed with glandular hairs. The leaves in the middle of the rosette are clearly decurrent. The margins are denticulate or somewhat so, rarely subentire.

=== Flowers ===
The pink, rarely white, flowers are arranged in an inflorescence in the form of a raceme, 15 to 35 cm in length with 15 to 40 individual flowers. The inflorescence has glandular hairs along its shaft, is not stiff, and is secundiflorous, meaning the flowers follow each other in succession. The flowers have a 1 to 2 cm long pedicel which is curved at the base, and shorter to equal in length to the subtending bracts. The flowers hang somewhat, and are separated by internodes of 8-15mm. The bracts are 12 to 20mm in length and 2 to 3mm broad, glandular and lanceolate in shape.

=== Chemistry ===
According to Dutch botanist Herman Boerhaave, writing at the turn of the 17th century, Digitalis species are highly poisonous if directly ingested. All parts are poisonous. In studies, the restriction of calcium ions resulted in cardenolide accumulation in D. thapsi. Calcium quantity affects the redox chemical reactions in the cells. Without calcium, changes in antioxidant function were observed and catalase activity was slow. In another study, lack of calcium retarded growth and promoted digoxin formation. Manganese sulfate and lithium chloride also increased the digoxin concentration, but did not affect growth. Calcium oxalate crystals have also been isolated from D. thapsi.

=== Similar species ===
In 1841 Pierre Edmond Boissier considered it the most similar to D. mariana, which he was then describing as a new species, having collected from the same region. In the dichotomous key in the Flora Iberica, it is keyed out to D. mariana, D. minor and D. purpurea. D. thapsi is distinguished from these three other similar species by being the only very sticky species, being completely covered in relatively long, yellowish, glandular hairs. It is also the only species in which the leaves in the middle of the rosette are clearly decurrent. D. minor, an endemic of the Balearic Islands, is not sympatric with D. thapsi.

== Distribution ==
Digitalis thapsi is an endemic species of the Iberian Peninsula, occurring in both Portugal and Spain. It grows in the mountains and rocky plains of the central and central-western parts of the Iberian Peninsula, especially in the Sistema Central and its extensions between the rivers of the Douro and Tagus.

It is widespread in Spain, occurring in the western and central parts of the country. It does not occur on the Balearic Islands. It occurs in the provinces of Ávila, Badajoz, Cáceres, Córdoba, Guadalajara, Madrid, Salamanca, Segovia, Soria, Toledo and Zamora. It has incidentally been found in the province of Burgos. In Andalucía it is only found in the north of the region, in the western Sierra Morena, where it is uncommon; it has been collected more often in the mountains of central Spain.

In Portugal it primarily occurs in the northern and central interior, more precisely in the districts of Bragança, Vila Real, Guarda, Viseu, Castelo Branco, Portalegre and Évora. With less frequency, it has also been found in the Porto, Aveiro, Coimbra, Santarém, Beja and Faro Districts.

== Ecology ==
Digitalis thapsi grows in acidic soils. It grows on rocky ground and on slopes. It prefers sunny, open and disturbed places. It generally grows on soils derived from granite, but also sometimes on quartzite and schist. It grows at (rarely 100-) 500–1500 metres in altitude.

The specific phytosociological suballiance and alliance wherein it occurs is called 'Rumici indurati-Dianthion lusitani', which is in the order 'Phagnalo saxatilis-Rumicetalia indurati', in the class 'Phagnalo saxatilis-Rumicetea indurati'. It is a characteristic species of this phytocoenosis. In this habitat it occurs together with these following characteristic species: Antirrhinum graniticum subsp. graniticum, Antirrhinum rupestris, Arrhenatherum fernandesii, Biscutella bilbilitana, Centaurea monticola subsp. citricolor, Centaurea pinnata, Coincya leptocarpa, Coincya longirostra, Coincya pseudoerucastrum subsp. pseudoerucastrum, Coincya rupestris, Conopodium bunioides subsp. aranii, Conopodium majus subsp. marizianum, Crepis oporinoides, Dianthus crassipes subsp. crassipes, Dianthus crassipes subsp. sereneanus, Dianthus lusitanus, Digitalis mariana (both subspecies), Digitalis purpurea subsp. toletana, Erodium mouretti, Erysimum linifolium subsp. lagascae, Festuca duriotagana, Jasione sessiliflora subsp. tomentosa, Scrophularia oxyrhincha, Scrophularia sublyrata, Sedum hirsutum subsp. baeticum, Silene marizii, Silene × montistellensis and Verbascum rotundifolium subsp. castellanum.

In its native lands it flowers from June to July. In cultivation it flowers in late spring to early summer. A study of the fruiting activity in D. thapsi showed that production, size and number of seeds were interrelated. Analysis has shown that seed weight is not related to the length of the cotyledon, and that the length of the fifth leaf can serve as a useful factor in determining the genetic variability among specimens.

== Uses ==
=== Agriculture ===
It is known that livestock avoid eating this plant, but an exception are goats, which will eat the leaves and flowers in times of shortage. Nonetheless, the plant is poisonous for them, causing stupor and paralysis -this was apparently once not an uncommon occurrence in Spain, and has spawned a number of idioms.

=== Cultivation ===
The species is used as a perennial, ornamental plant. It is low-growing, so is used in the border. It grows well in half-shaded to sun-exposed areas in temperate regions. It prefers organically rich, reasonably well-drained, acidic soils. In Missouri it is said to require constantly moist soil. In British gardens moderate watering is required; the plant has an average drought tolerance, and is adaptable to dry shady areas. It is tolerant of deer. Many gardeners remove the spent flower spikes soon after bloom, not allowing it to go to seed.

Besides normal cultivation, D. thapsi has been propagated using explant culture, a technique employed by isolating and harvesting meristem cells from pieces of tissue. Auxins NAA, 2,4-D and IAA alone or combined with BA produced a callus. NAA caused root formation and BA shoot formation. NAA and BA combined induced organ generation more effectively. Plantlets obtained this way had a survival rate of 70%.

A cultivar called 'Spanish Peaks' with raspberry-rose-coloured flowers and a compact habitus has been available in the US.

=== Traditional ===
In Spain the traditional uses have practically been abandoned. Recorded traditional uses are often identical to that those of D. purpurea; when questioned many informants in Salamanca believed that these were in fact the same species. It is generally thought that the difference in flower colour is due to some characteristic of the soil. Local people are aware it is poisonous. It was once locally used in herbalism as a cardiac tonic in many places. Other folk medicinal uses are local to specific cities or villages: in the hills near Salamanca the leaves were steeped in water to use for a sore throat or a decoction used for infected wounds, in a town in Galicia the flowers in water were used to combat inflammations, in the provinces of Zamora and Salamanca boils are said to heal after applying a poultice of the burnt basal leaves.

== Conservation ==
It is not considered rare in a national or international perspective, but it has been classified as locally 'endangered' in the Regional Red List of Andalucía of 2005. The reason for this was that the different collection localities and populations in this region were fragmented and very small.
