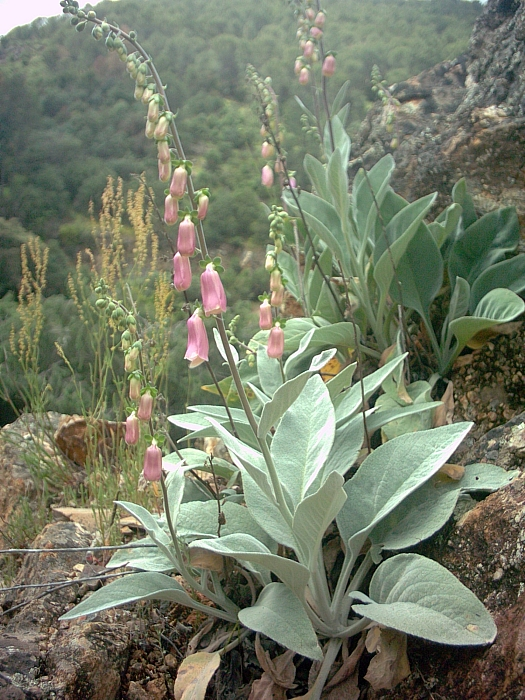
- Digitalis mariana in situ in late May in the Sierra Madrona, Ciudad Real, Spain

Scientific classification
- Kingdom: Plantae
- Clade: Embryophytes
- Clade: Tracheophytes
- Clade: Angiosperms
- Clade: Eudicots
- Clade: Asterids
- Order: Lamiales
- Family: Plantaginaceae
- Genus: Digitalis
- Species: D. mariana

Binomial name
- Digitalis mariana Boiss.

Synonyms
- Digitalis purpurea subsp. mariana (Boiss.) Rivas Goday; Digitalis purpurea subsp. heywoodii Pinto da Silva & M. Silva; Digitalis heywoodii (Pinto da Silva & M. Silva) Pinto da Silva & M. Silva; Digitalis purpurea var. mariana (Boiss.) Pau

= Digitalis mariana =

Species of flowering plant

Digitalis mariana is a flowering plant species in the family Plantaginaceae. It is a perennial foxglove with evergreen foliage and rose-red flowers, which are produced in summer. It is native to Portugal and Spain.

== Taxonomy ==
Digitalis mariana was first described as a new species by the Swiss botanist Pierre Edmond Boissier in 1841. Although the Flora Ibérica (2009) and the Plants of the World Online website (2017) consider it to be a valid, independent species, the Flora Europaea (1976) and the Euro+Med Plantbase (2011) considered it to be two subspecies of Digitalis purpurea: subspecies mariana, and subspecies heywoodii.

Two infraspecific taxa are accepted:

- Digitalis mariana subsp. mariana Boiss.
- Digitalis mariana subsp. heywoodii (Pinto da Silva & Silva) P. A. Hinz

== Description ==
The two subspecies can be distinguished by their flower colour and the indumentum on their inflorescence. The nominate form has purple-pink flowers and short glandular hairs of only 0.3–0.4 mm in length, heywoodii has flowers which are white, or very rarely, yellowish, sometimes with a pinkish line of various shades along the margin of the corolla, and the inflorescence is covered in longish, non-glandular hairs of 2–4 mm.

The nominate taxon is locally known in Spanish as campanitas or dedalera. The Spanish name verdolobo has been recorded for the subspecies heywoodii.

=== Similar species ===
Its native range it closely resembles Digitalis thapsi, which was also remarked upon by the first botanist to distinguish it as a new species, Boissier. In the dichotomous key in the Flora Iberica, it is keyed out to D. minor, D. purpurea and D. thapsi.

Digitalis thapsi is clearly distinguished by having a very sticky indumentum formed exclusively of yellowish, glandular hairs which are up to 0.6 mm in length, and having leaves in the middle of the rosette which are clearly decurrent.

Digitalis minor, an endemic of the Balearic Islands, is not sympatric to D. mariana. It is distinguished by having the capsule (fruit) clearly shorter than the calyx, a lower lip of the corolla with highly developed lateral lobes which are auricular (ear-like) in shape, clearly split down to the mouth of the tube.

Digitalis purpurea is the most similar species, according to the Flora Iberica key, being separated from D. mariana by having a calyx with the sepals ordinarily more-or-less recurved towards the corolla, sometimes arranged patently, and the corolla tube gradually tightening towards its base.

In D. mariana the calyx has sepals which are patent or subpatent and the corolla tube abruptly tightens towards its base, distinguishing it from D. purpurea. The capsule is equal or larger in length than the calyx, and the lower lip of the corolla has lateral lobes which are little developed, rounded, not auricular, nor split to the mouth of the tube, which distinguishes both these species from D. minor. All three species are distinguished from D. thapsi by the indumentum lacking the long, yellowish, glandular hairs, being less sticky, and instead having silvery or greyish hairs, not all hairs being glandular -or when they are, these are all subsessile.

== Distribution ==
Both subspecies are primarily found in the Sierra Morena mountain ranges of the southern Iberian Peninsula, which extend from Portugal to Spain. The nominate subspecies is more predominant in the east, the other to the west.

The subspecies heywoodii has been recorded in Alto Alentejo in Portugal, and in Spain in the provinces of Badajoz, Cáceres, Córdoba and Ciudad Real. In Andalucía it is found in the northeast(???) of the region, on the southern flanks of the Sierra Morena, where it is uncommon.

The nominate taxon has been found in Badajoz, Córdoba, Ciudad Real, Jaén and Sevilla, and perhaps also Huelva. In Andalucía it is found in the northeast, on the southern flanks of the Sierra Morena, where it is uncommon.

== Ecology ==
Both subspecies grow in cracks in the stone in rocky areas. The subspecies heywoodii is most often found in fissures in granite and slate. The nominate subspecies is usually found in more acidic soils, and often in rock falls, loose scree or among boulders.

The specific phytosociological suballiance and alliance wherein both subspecies occur is called 'Rumici indurati-Dianthion lusitani', which is in the order 'Phagnalo saxatilis-Rumicetalia indurati', in the class 'Phagnalo saxatilis-Rumicetea indurati'. It is a characteristic species of this phytocoenosis. In this habitat it occurs together with these following characteristic species: Antirrhinum graniticum subsp. graniticum, Antirrhinum rupestris, Arrhenatherum fernandesii, Biscutella bilbilitana, Centaurea monticola subsp. citricolor, Centaurea pinnata, Coincya leptocarpa, Coincya longirostra, Coincya pseudoerucastrum subsp. pseudoerucastrum, Coincya rupestris, Conopodium bunioides subsp. aranii, Conopodium majus subsp. marizianum, Crepis oporinoides, Dianthus crassipes subsp. crassipes, Dianthus crassipes subsp. sereneanus, Dianthus lusitanus, Digitalis thapsi, Digitalis purpurea subsp. toletana, Erodium mouretti, Erysimum linifolium subsp. lagascae, Festuca duriotagana, Jasione sessiliflora subsp. tomentosa, Scrophularia oxyrhincha, Scrophularia sublyrata, Sedum hirsutum subsp. baeticum, Silene marizii, Silene × montistellensis and Verbascum rotundifolium subsp. castellanum.

== Conservation ==
Both forms are legally protected in Extremadura, where they have the status of a 'taxon of special interest'. Digitalis heywoodii was listed as 'not threatened' in a 1984 national list of rare or endemic plants of Spain, but in 2000 it was listed as 'vulnerable' in the Lista roja de la flora vascular Española. Both subspecies were included as 'vulnerable' in the Regional Red List of Andalucía of 2005. The reason for this was that the different collection localities and populations in this region were small.
