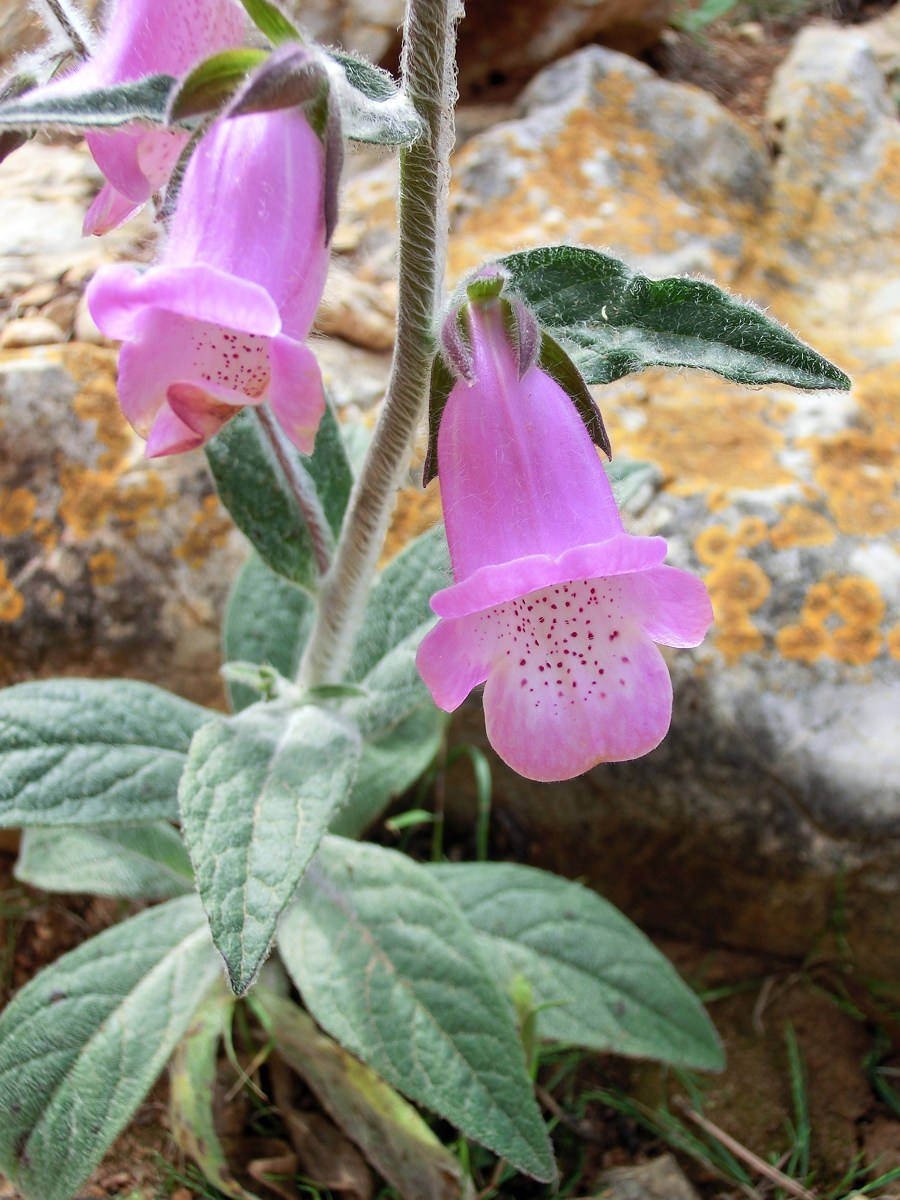
- Digitalis minor showing flowers and foliage in situ on Mallorca's Formentor peninsula.

Scientific classification
- Kingdom: Plantae
- Clade: Embryophytes
- Clade: Tracheophytes
- Clade: Spermatophytes
- Clade: Angiosperms
- Clade: Eudicots
- Clade: Asterids
- Order: Lamiales
- Family: Plantaginaceae
- Genus: Digitalis
- Species: D. minor

Binomial name
- Digitalis minor L.

Synonyms
- Digitalis dubia J.J.Rodr., 1874; Digitalis minor Bourg ex Nyman, 1881; Digitalis dubia var. longipendunculata Font Quer ex Pau, 1914; Digitalis purpurea subsp. dubia (J.J.Rodr.) Knoche, 1922; Digitalis dubia var. denudata Palau Ferrer, nomina nuda; Digitalis dubia subsp. palaui Garcías Font & Marcos, 1958; Digitalis dubia subsp. dubia var. marcosii Garcías Font, 1958; Digitalis purpurea f. dubia (J.J.Rodr.) O.Bolòs & Vigo, 1983; Digitalis purpurea f. palaui (Garcías Font & Marcos) O.Bolòs & Vigo, 1983; Digitalis dubia var. palaui (Garcías Font & Marcos) Pericás & Rosselló, 1987; Digitalis minor var. palaui (Garcias Font & Marcos) Hinz & Rosselló, 1987; Digitalis minor subsp. palaui (Garcías Font & Marcos) Romo, 1994

= Digitalis minor =

Species of flowering plant

Digitalis minor is a species of flowering plant in family Plantaginaceae, which has been called dwarf Spanish foxglove. It is a biennial or short-lived perennial species of foxglove which is endemic to the Balearic Islands with large, pendulous, pink or purple flowers. Closely related to the common purple foxglove, it is best distinguished by its small fruits. It is one of the only foxgloves to grow in calciferous, alkaline soils.

Local vernacular names in the Catalan language are: didalera, didals, didals de la Mare de Déu, boca de llop and herba de Santa Maria.

== Taxonomy ==
For a long time this species was known under the name of Digitalis dubia, now considered a synonym of D. minor, but until recently this name was still considered to be the correct name of this species outside of Spain (i.e. in the Flora Europaea (1976), and the Euro+Med Plantbase (2011)).

The present name is indeed older and has priority, that is, should both names describe the same taxon; Linnaeus first described a taxon under the name D. minor in 1771, only writing "habitat in Hispania" regarding its origin. Only recently have foreign institutions such as the Plants of the World Online (2017) accepted the priority of Linnaeus, although Spanish botanists had been using the name as early as the 1990s.

Linnaeus was actually not the first to describe this species; in his 1771 work he cites Joseph Pitton de Tournefort's 1700 Institutiones rei herbariae, first published in 1694 as Eléments de botanique, ou Méthode pour reconnaître les Plantes, as the source of the taxon. Tournefort calls the taxon Digitalis Hispanica, purpurea, minor. Tournefort was not the first to describe the plant either, in his book he cites two older botanical works for this taxon, Paolo Boccone's 1697 Mvseo di fisica e di esperienze variato and Jacques Barrelier's Plantae per Galliam, Hispaniam et aliam observatae, at the time an unpublished manuscript composed in 1697, but eventually published in Leiden in 1714. Both Barrelier and Boccone described the plant as having the leaves of a Verbena and having collected it in Spain.

D. dubia was first described by the Spanish botanist Juan Joaquín Rodríguez y Femenías in 1874, who states that the name D. minor, as applied to the flora of Menorca by Pierre André Pourret (it had also been identified as D. thapsi in other 19th century works), was not the same species as D. minor as it was originally used by Linnaeus, which he did not believe occurred on Menorca. According to the table provided by Rodríguez, D. dubia was distinguished from D. minor, at least in the herbarium, by having secondary leaf veins which run straight as opposed to bending towards the apex; non-swelling, downturned pedicels twice the length than the calyx as opposed to patent, swelling in size at their apex, and shorter than the calyx; and the calyx segments being oval and rounded with blunt apexes, as opposed to lanceolate and lanceolate-oval with sharp apexes.

In 1881, in his book series attempting to list all the plants of Europe, the Conspectus Florae Europaeae, Carl Fredrik Nyman (assisted by Eugène Bourgeau in this part) followed Rodríguez, listing both his name D. dubia (and following his synonymy) and Linnaeus's D. minor, which according to them had been collected in Cordova.

=== Varieties ===
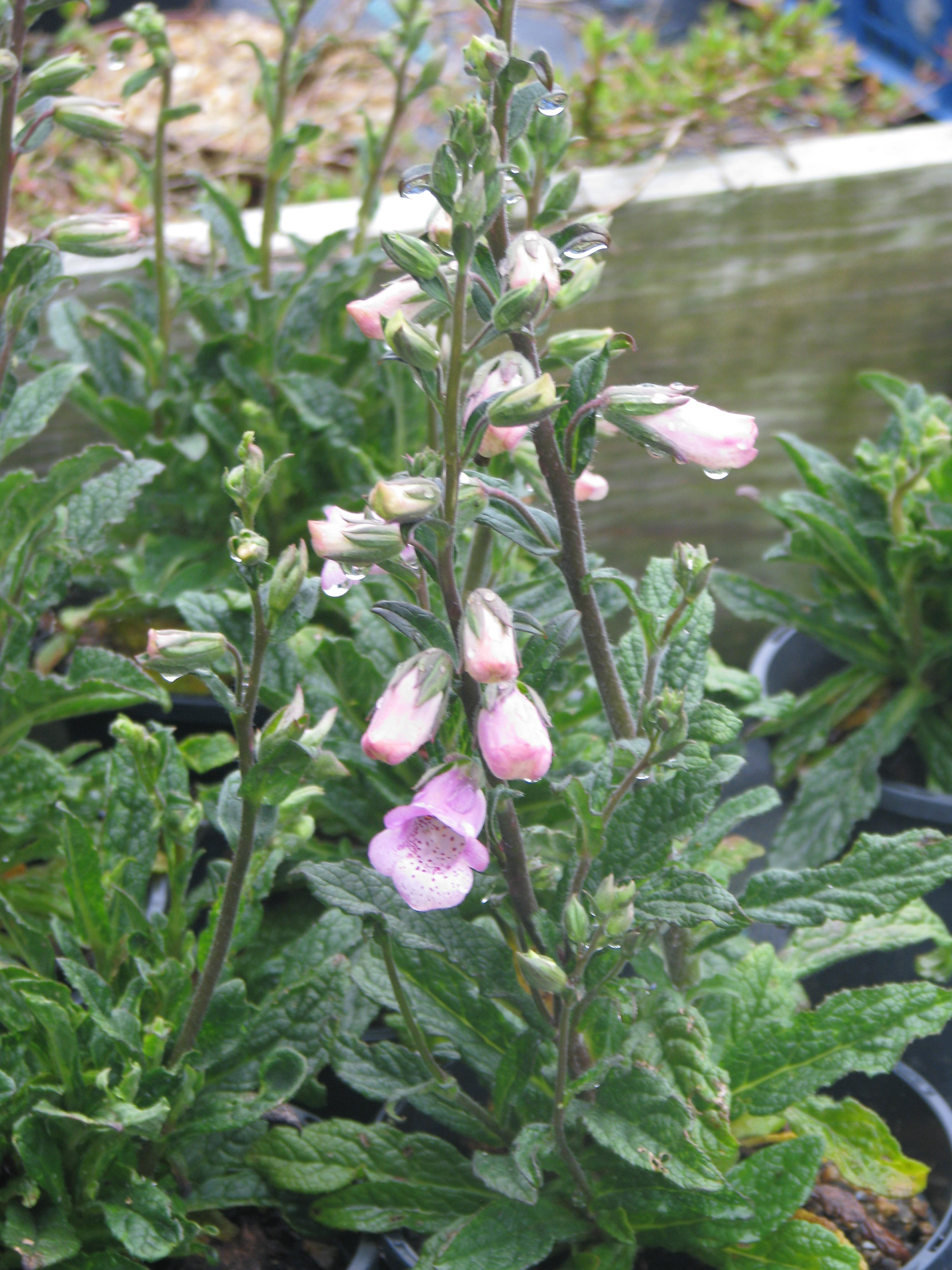
Digitalis minor var. palaui

This species is highly polymorphic; it is phenotypically diverse with individuals being quite different from each other. Until recently there were two varieties recognised, although the Flora Iberica no longer does so:

- Digitalis minor var. minor which is covered with pubescent hairs (trichomes).
- Digitalis minor var. palaui which is hairless (glabrous). Such plants occur on both Minorca and Majorca.

In 1914 Carlos Pau y Español published Digitalis dubia var. longipendunculata described by Pius Font i Quer in a letter from Menorca to him. This variety supposedly had pedicels twice the length than the calyx and green leaves weakly tomentose on their undersides. Pau expressed doubt as to the validity of the taxon. A pharmacist and botanist from Mallorca, Llorenç Garcías i Font, described another two varieties from his island in 1958, both named after local botanical friends: subsp. dubia var. marcosii and subsp. palaui. According to him, subsp. palaui had much larger, green, glabrous, leaves which were more lanceolate and more attenuated. The pedicels, branches, bracts and sepals were puberulent and purplish. The variety marcosii was supposedly intermediate between the two.

Angel María Romo Díez promoted the taxa to the rank of subspecies in his 1994 book Flores silvestres de Baleares.

A 2001 genetic study using a large number of specimens from each of the three islands found them to cluster into three main populations, one for each island, although the results were not statistically significant. The two different varieties described above do not correspond with genetics: on Majorca var. minor and palaui are clearly differentiated genetically in two data analyses, but on Menorca the two phenotypes (hairy vs. hairless) are not especially different from each other genetically. On Majorca the populations can be differentiated by the geographic area they were collected in. This also explains the differentiation of var. palaui, because on this island the collected plant specimens phenotypically classified as palaui were somewhat isolated geographically from other subpopulations. When the data was reassessed using a different statistical method, little variation was seen between the two taxa. Relative genetic diversity between populations is small, whereas the genetic diversity is high within populations. Lastly, populations identified as palaui were not closer related to each other than they were to surrounding nominate populations. The study does not support the recognition of the two infraspecific taxa.

=== Types ===
No one seems to have designated a holotype, until a lectotype was designated in 1980 by two Dutch agronomists.

== Description ==
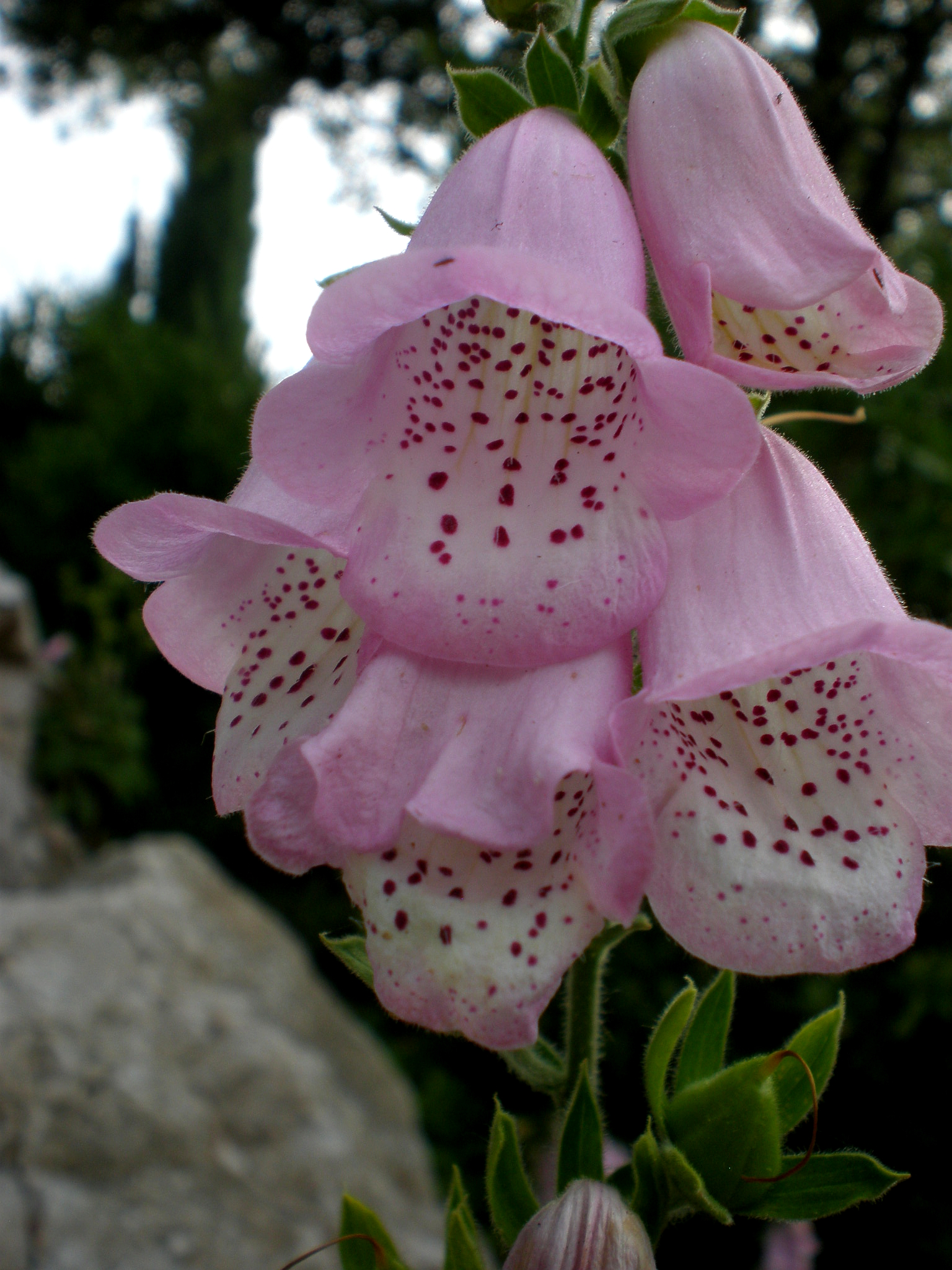
flowers; note the clefts splitting the lateral lobes from the central lobe of the lower lip down to the mouth of the corolla

This species is a biennial or a short-lived perennial with pink, pendulous flowers. Uncommon white-flowered forms exist. The plants are somewhat caespitose, often forming a small cluster of densely arranged rosettes of leaves. The entire plant is usually covered in a tomentose indumentum of hairs (trichomes), of which only some are glandular, but on occasion glabrous plants are encountered. The base of the plant is woody, branched low at the ground or with a single rosette. Each rosette sends up an angular stem 10 to 80cm in height, coloured green or purplish. These stems have a dense indumentum of 0.4 to 0.7mm long non-glandular hairs, and very short, subsessile, glandular hairs; although sometimes (rarely) glabrous. There are few leaves on the length of these stems, most leaves are clustered at the base of the plant.

The leaves are usually greyish-green. The leaves midway towards the top of the plant are not decurrent. The lowest basal leaf blades are 3 to 10cm in length by 1 to 4cm in width, elliptic to oval in shape, soft and not coriaceous (leathery) in texture, flat or sometimes somewhat revolute, with a blunt (obtuse) apex, a subentire or crenulate margin, and attenuate towards the 8-40mm long petiole. The ash-grey indumentum is very dense on the underside of the leaves, composed of both purplish, non-glandular, 0.3 to 0.5mm long hairs as well as subsessile, glandular hairs, although in rare cases the leaves are glabrescent with only the glandular hairs, or completely glabrous.

The inflorescence is 5 to 25cm in length, exceptionally only 1.5cm or to 53cm, secundiflorous (flowers arranged to one side of the inflorescence), and usually with 5 to 20 flowers, exceptionally with only 1, or up to 36. Individual plants are polymorphic, with few or many flowers. The peduncle has internodes 9 to 27mm in length, and is covered in 0.4 to 0.7mm, non-glandular long hairs and subsessile, glandular hairs 0.3 to 0.4mm in length. It has lanceolate-shaped bracts at the nodes; these are 3 to 20mm long, 2 to 4mm broad, as hairy as the rest of the plant.

The flowers have a 4 to 21mm long pedicel which is more-or-less straight, and either shorter, equal or larger than the bracts. The calyx has unequal sepals which are pubescent and more-or-less appressed to the corolla. The lateral sepals are 8 to 16mm long, 2 to 4mm broad, elliptic or lanceolate, with sharp apexes. The top sepal is shorter and more elongated than the rest. The corolla is 28 to 35mm, sub-bilobed, bell-shaped, pink to pinkish-purple (exceptionally white) and hairy on the outside. The corolla tube is 20 to 30mm long, 14 to 23mm wide, one or two times longer than broad, and gradually attenuates towards its base. The front part of the inside of the tube has dark-purple, 1 to 1.5mm dots; these dots are surrounded by white auras, which fuse together to form a large white patch. The tube is usually ciliated at its mouth. The upper lip is entire or bilobed. The lower lip has well-developed, auricular (ear-like), lateral lobes; these are clearly cleft up to the mouth. The central lobe is 6 to 13mm. The ovary is covered in a glandular pubescence; the style has a variable indumentum, sometimes it is glabrous.

The fruit is a capsule 10 to 15mm long, 6 to 10mm broad, ovoid or almost spherical in shape, clearly much shorter than the calyx, and covered in glandular pubescence. The chestnut brown-coloured seeds are 0.5 to 0.7mm in length, 0.3 to 0.5mm in width, and sub-cylindrical to obconical in shape.

=== Similar species ===
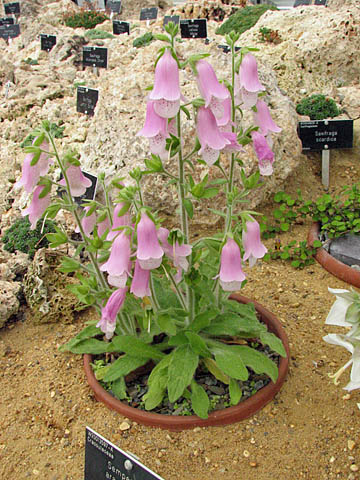
Digitalis minor in cultivation. Note the size of the capsule (fruit) in relation to the calyx

In the dichotomous key in the Flora Iberica, it is keyed out to Digitalis mariana, D. purpurea and D. thapsi. D. minor is not sympatric to any other species, if the plant is growing on the Balearic Islands, it is most likely D. minor. It is distinguished by having the capsule (fruit) clearly shorter than the calyx, a lower lip of the corolla with highly developed lateral lobes which are auricular in shape, clearly split down to the mouth of the tube.

Digitalis thapsi is clearly distinguished by having a very sticky indumentum formed exclusively of yellowish, glandular hairs which are up to 0.6mm in length, as opposed to having silvery or greyish hairs, and having leaves in the middle of the rosette which are clearly decurrent.

Digitalis purpurea is very similar species, being separated from D. minor by having a larger capsules.

In D. mariana the calyx has sepals which are patent or subpatent and the corolla tube abruptly tightens towards its base, distinguishing it from D. purpurea. The capsule is equal or larger in length than the calyx, and the lower lip of the corolla has lateral lobes which are little developed, rounded, not auricular, nor split to the mouth of the tube, which distinguishes both these species from D. minor.

=== Cytology ===
The chromosome number is 2n=56 in all specimens examined so far. Digitalis minor produces cardenolide chemicals.

== Distribution ==
Digitalis minor is endemic to the eastern Balearic Islands, where it occurs on the islands of Majorca, Menorca and Cabrera.

At the end of the Oligocene and beginning of the Miocene, the African continent pressing against the Iberian microplate uplifted the mountains of the Baetic System, of which to the east a long peninsula was created in the Mediterranean Sea -a land bridge possibly connecting all the way to Corsica and Sardinia (then a single land mass, it later rotated to the left, with Minorca breaking off at the end of the Oligocene). During the end of the Burdigalian and the Langhian stages of this epoch, the Balearic Islands existed as two large islands, sometimes connecting to the Andalusian mainland over the next few million years. The Messinian stage was a special period in Europe: the Mediterranean connection to the Atlantic Ocean was closed off, and in a period of a million years the entire sea evaporated, leaving a vast layer of salt a kilometre in thickness and the Nile River emptying into a vast salt marsh somewhere in the middle. Corsica and the Balearic Islands were connected again, allowing the migration of species. In the Pliocene the islands were separated again from mainland as a large island, and in the Pleistocene they broke up into two large islands to the east and west. The eastern island broke up to form Minorca and Majorca during the Würm glaciation, as well as a number of times before hand.

This geological history explains the distribution of certain shared species of plants on these different Mediterranean islands, with species immigrating to the Balearic Islands from either the east or west, depending on the epoch. According to Contandriopoulos and Cardona, D. minor is an example of latter, with its ancestors being D. purpurea subsp. purpurea moving into the region from Spain in the west, this would then mean that the taxon was eventually extirpated from the western islands. According to Petra-Andrea Hinz Alcaraz this invasion occurred sometime before Messinian. This would make the species a 'schizoendemic', and endemic which evolved from a neighbouring population after being isolated from it. This method of speciation is known as vicariance. The genetic structure of the present population supports the theory that in relatively recent times D. minor existed as a single population on a large conjoined island.

The genetic structure of the present population, specifically the relatively high genetic diversity within populations as opposed to between them, also indicates that this species has never been particularly rare - there is little evidence of population or subpopulation bottlenecks.

== Ecology ==
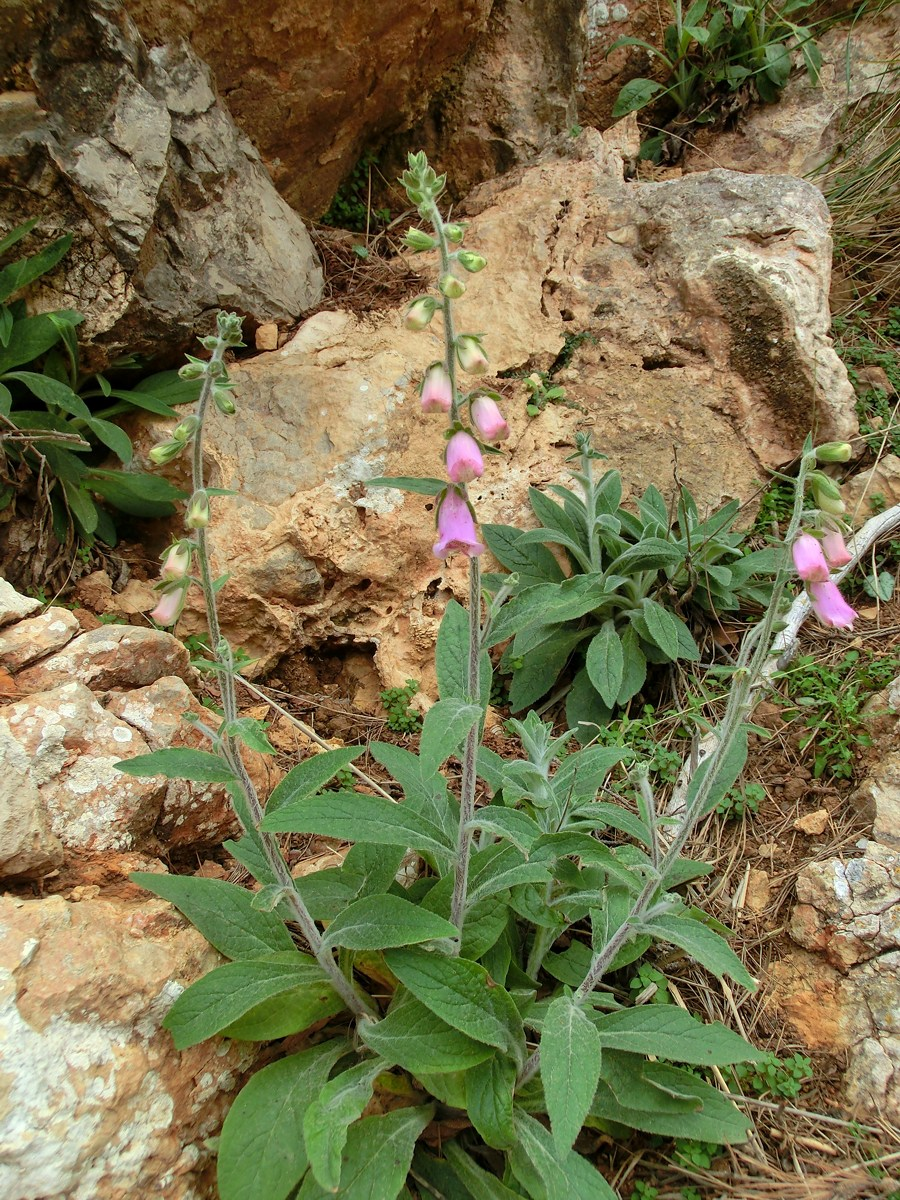
Digitalis minor growing among calciferous rocks on the Formentor peninsula, Majorca, flowering in May

In its native environment it flowers in May and June, or exceptionally in April or July. It is a protandrous plant, with the male parts of the flower becoming mature before the female parts do so. There is much evidence for a large amount of gene flow among individuals.

It is found growing in rocky areas where it inhabits cracks in rocks and cliffs, wet rocks, and rock fissures, in sunny spots and shade. It also occurs on seaside cliffs. Populations grow among calciferous rocks; it is one of the very few species of foxglove to prefer such alkaline soils. Very rarely it is found growing in siliceous soils. It grows from sea level to 1,400 metres in altitude.

It grows associated with a high number of endemics or characteristic Balearics: Arabis verna, Arum pictum, Brassica balearicum, Cerastium luridum, Clypeola jonthlaspi, Crepis triasii, Delphinium pictum, Globularia majoricensis, Helichrysum lamarcki, Laserpitium gallicum, Linaria aequitriloba, L. aeruginosa, Rhamnus oleoides, Rumex intermedius, Scabiosa cretica, Sesleria coerulans subsp. insularis and Sibthorpia africana.

== Uses ==
A gene taken from Arabidopsis thaliana was experimentally inserted into the genome of Digitalis minor, creating transgenic plants. This was done to explore if the amount of cardiac glycosides could be boosted, as (other) Digitalis species are still the main industrial sources for these medicines. The metabolic engineering experiment was a success, and expression of the new gene resulted in an increased sterol and cardenolide production in the resultant plants.
