= Gymnomesium =

Gymnomesium may refer to:

- Gymnomesium Schott, an obsolete synonym for the plant genus Arum
- Gymnomesium Boyce, a plant subgenus within Arum
