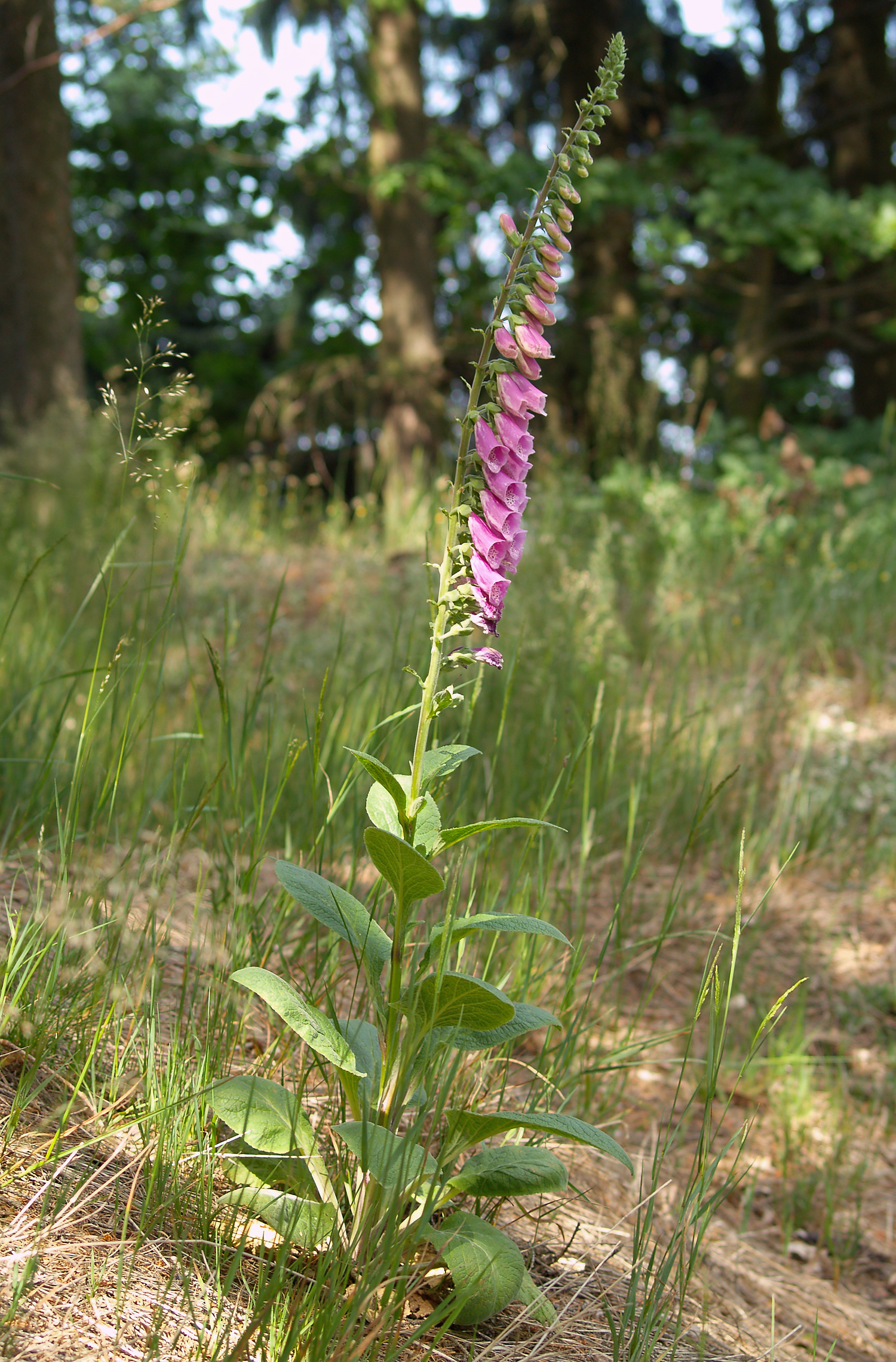

Conservation status
- Least Concern (IUCN 3.1)

Scientific classification
- Kingdom: Plantae
- Clade: Tracheophytes
- Clade: Angiosperms
- Clade: Eudicots
- Clade: Asterids
- Order: Lamiales
- Family: Plantaginaceae
- Genus: Digitalis
- Species: D. purpurea

Binomial name
- Digitalis purpurea L.

= Digitalis purpurea =

Species of toxic flowering plant

Digitalis purpurea, the foxglove or common foxglove, is a toxic species of flowering plant in the plantain family Plantaginaceae, native to and widespread throughout most of temperate Europe. It has also naturalized in parts of North America, as well as some other temperate regions. The plant is a popular garden subject, with many cultivars available. It is the original source of the heart medicine digoxin (also called digitalis or digitalin). This biennial plant grows as a rosette of leaves in the first year after sowing, before flowering and then dying in the second year (i.e., it is monocarpic). It generally produces enough seeds so that new plants will continue to grow in a garden setting. Foxglove was introduced into official medicine by William Withering in 1785.

== Description ==
Digitalis purpurea is an herbaceous biennial or short-lived perennial plant. The leaves are spirally arranged, simple, 10–35 cm (4–14 in) long and 5–12 cm (2–5 in) broad, and are covered with gray-white pubescent and glandular hairs, imparting a woolly texture. The foliage forms a tight rosette at ground level in the first year.

The flowering stem develops in the second year, typically 1–2 m (3.3–6.6 ft) tall, sometimes longer. The flowers are arranged in a showy, terminal, elongated cluster, and each flower is tubular and pendent. The flowers are typically purple, but some plants, especially those under cultivation, may be pink, rose, yellow, or white. The inside surface of the flower tube is heavily spotted. The flowering period is early summer, sometimes with additional flower stems developing later in the season. The plant is frequented by bees, which climb right inside the flower tube to gain the nectar within.

The fruit is a capsule which splits open at maturity to release the numerous tiny seeds, dispersal is by wind.

== Distribution ==
=== Native range ===
Digitalis purpurea has a native range that spans across several countries in Western Europe and North Africa.In Western Europe, it is native to Belgium, Czech Republic, France, Germany, Ireland, Norway, Portugal, Spain, Sweden and the United Kingdom. In North Africa the species can be found in Morocco. Additionally, it occurs naturally on the islands of Corsica and Sardinia.

=== Introduced range ===
Digitalis purpurea has been introduced throughout the world into countries and continents outside of its natural range. Due to introductions, the species has expanded its range further into Europe and Africa, as well as colonizing continents outside of the natural range, including Asia, North America, South America, and Oceania.

Digitalis purpurea has been introduced extensively throughout Europe, including Austria, the Baltic States, Belarus, Denmark, Hungary, the Netherlands, Poland, Réunion, and Ukraine. It has also found its way to the Azores, the Canary Islands, Central European Russia, Madeira, and the Sakhalin and Kuril Islands.

In North America, it has been introduced into more than twenty states of the United States: Arkansas, California, Connecticut, Idaho, Maine, Maryland, Massachusetts, Michigan, Montana, New Hampshire, New Jersey, New York, North Carolina, Ohio, Oregon, Pennsylvania, Vermont, Washington, West Virginia, Wisconsin, and Wyoming. In Canada, it has colonized multiple provinces, including British Columbia, New Brunswick, Newfoundland, Nova Scotia, Ontario, and Québec.

In South America, Digitalis purpurea has been introduced into Argentina, specifically in the regions of Northeast, Northwest, and South. It also can be found in Bolivia, Brazil (specifically the South and Southeast regions), Chile (Central region), Colombia, Costa Rica, Cuba, Ecuador, El Salvador, Guatemala, Jamaica, Mexico (Central, Gulf, Northeast, Southeast, and Southwest regions), Peru, Uruguay, and Venezuela.

Digitalis purpurea has made its way to various regions of Asia, including China (specifically the South-Central and Southeast regions), Korea, and Vietnam. In Africa, it can be found in Malawi and Zimbabwe. Furthermore, it has been introduced to the island nations of New Zealand, both the North and South Islands. It is also an established weed across multiple locations in Tasmania, Australia.

== Subspecies and hybrids ==
- Digitalis purpurea subsp. purpurea – most of Europe and Macaronesia and widely introduced to other parts of the world.
- Digitalis purpurea subsp. amandiana (Samp.) P.A.Hinz – northern Portugal (specifically around the Douro Basin).
- Digitalis purpurea subsp. mauretanica (Humbert & Maire) A.M.Romo – Morocco.
- Digitalis purpurea subsp. toletana (Font Quer) P.A.Hinz – central Spain.
- Digitalis × fulva Lindl. 1821 (hybrid formula: D. grandiflora × purpurea).

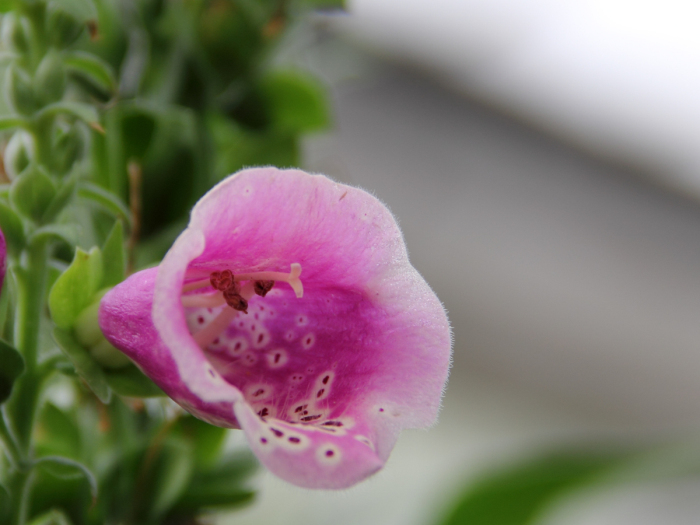
A single flower of Digitalis purpurea

Digitalis purpurea subsp. mariana is a synonym for D. mariana subsp. mariana, and D. purpurea subsp. heywoodii is a synonym for D. mariana subsp. heywoodii.

D. dubia, a name used for populations of foxglove growing among calciferous rocks on shady cliff faces on the island of Mallorca, is now considered a synonym of D. minor, but until recently it had been either considered to be a valid species (i.e. in the Flora Europaea (1976), and the Euro+Med Plantbase (2011)), as well as classified as D. purpurea subsp. dubia in 1922, or Digitalis purpurea f. dubia by Spanish taxonomists in 1983.

== Ecology ==
Digitalis purpurea grows in acidic soils, in partial sunlight to deep shade, in a range of habitats, including open woods, woodland clearings, moorland and heath margins, sea-cliffs, rocky mountain slopes and hedge banks. It is commonly found and readily colonises sites where the ground has been disturbed, such as recently cleared woodland, or where the vegetation has been burnt. It also colonises areas of land that have been disturbed by clear-felling and by construction projects, being among the first wildflowers to reappear, often in large quantities. Foxgloves are eurytopic plants, as their seeds germinate when exposed to light; for this reason, they are generally absent from shaded areas, such as within woodlands.

D. purpurea is most successful in humus-rich soil, but it can succeed in any mesic soil; it only needs a small amount of soil for survival.

Bees use its nectar to make honey.

Larvae of the foxglove pug (Eupithecia pulchellata), a moth, consume the flowers of the common foxglove for food. The caterpillars of this moth crawl into the newly opening flowers, one caterpillar to a flower. It then spins a silken web over the mouth of the flower, sealing it, and then proceeds to feed on the stamens and developing seeds. When the other uninfected flowers fall off, the corolla of the infected flowers remain on the plant, and the caterpillar then pupates in the flower. The species is uncommon, it has been recorded in Britain, Germany, Switzerland and Austria. Other species of Lepidoptera have been recorded eating the leaves, including Mellicta athalia and Xestia ashworthii in Britain, Eurodryas aurinia in Romania, and Mellicta deione in Portugal.

== Genetics ==
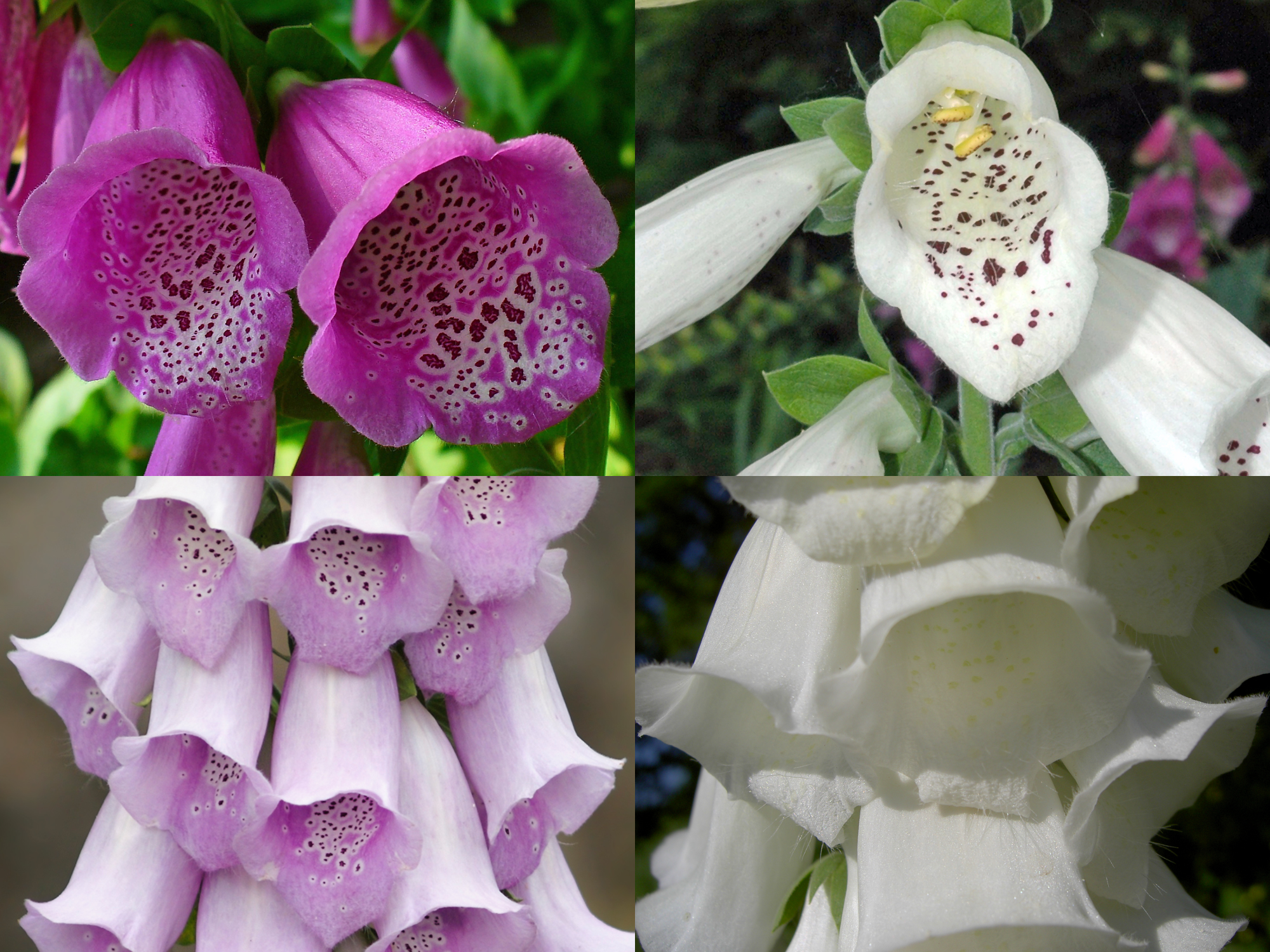
The four possible phenotypes for Digitalis purpurea

The colours of the petals of the Digitalis purpurea are known to be determined by at least three genes that interact with each other.

The M gene determines the production of a purple pigment, a type of anthocyanin. The m gene does not produce this pigment. The D gene is an enhancer of the M gene, and leads it to produce a large amount of the pigment. The d gene does not enhance the M gene, and only a small amount of pigment is produced. Lastly, the W gene causes the pigment be deposited only in some spots, while the w gene allows the pigment to be spread all over the flower.

This combination leads to four phenotypes:

- M/_; W/_; _/_ = a white flower with purple spots;
- m/m; _/_; _/_ = an albino flower with yellow spots;
- M/_; w/w; d/d = a light purple flower;
- M/_; w/w; D/_ = a dark purple flower.

== Cultivation ==
The plant is a popular ornamental, providing height and colour in late spring and early summer. Cultivated forms often show flowers completely surrounding the central spike, in contrast to the wild form, where the flowers only appear on one side. Numerous cultivars have been developed with a range of colours. Seeds are frequently sold as a mixture (e.g. Excelsior hybrids, in shades of white, pink and purple). Some strains are easily grown by the novice gardener, while others are more challenging. They may also be purchased as potted plants in the spring.

Digitalis purpurea is hardy down to −15 °C (5 °F) (USDA zones 4–9).

=== Award of garden merit ===
The following selections have gained the Royal Horticultural Society's Award of Garden Merit:

- Camelot Series:
  - 'Camelot Cream'
  - 'Camelot Lavender'
  - 'Camelot Rose'
  - 'Camelot White'
- Dalmatian Series:
  - 'Dalmatian Crème'
  - 'Dalmatian Peach'
  - 'Dalmatian Purple'
  - 'Dalmatian White'
- D. purpurea f. alba
- 'Martina'
- 'Pam's Choice'
- 'The Shirley' (Gloxinioides group)
- Digitalis × mertonensis (the strawberry foxglove)

== Toxicity ==
Due to the presence of the cardiac glycoside digitoxin, the leaves, flowers and seeds of this plant are all poisonous to humans and some animals and can be fatal if ingested.

The main toxins in Digitalis spp. are the two chemically similar cardiac glycosides: digitoxin and digoxin. Like other cardiac glycosides, these toxins exert their effects by inhibiting the ATPase activity of a complex of transmembrane proteins that form the sodium potassium ATPase pump, (Na^{+}/K^{+}-ATPase). Inhibition of the Na^{+}/K^{+}-ATPase in turn causes a rise not only in intracellular Na^{+}, but also in calcium, which in turn results in increased force of myocardial muscle contractions. In other words, at precisely the right dosage, Digitalis toxin can cause the heart to beat more strongly. However, digitoxin, digoxin and several other cardiac glycosides, such as ouabain, have narrow therapeutic windows (i.e., because of their steep dose-response curves, minute increases in the dosage of these drugs can make the difference between an ineffective dose and a fatal one). There are now better options with a wider therapeutic window.

Symptoms of Digitalis poisoning include a low pulse rate, nausea, vomiting, and uncoordinated contractions of different parts of the heart, leading to cardiac arrest and finally death.

=== Medicinal use ===
Extracted from the leaves, this same cardiac glycoside digitoxin is used as a medication for heart failure. Its clinical use was pioneered by William Withering, who recognized it "reduced dropsy", increased urine flow, and had a powerful effect on the heart by making it beat slower but more efficiently waiting for the heart to fill with blood before pumping. Following the publication of his work in 1785 (An Account of the Foxglove, and Some of Its Medical Uses), in which he described 163 medical cases involving preparations made from Digitalis, the plant began to be used in the treatment of various diseases, mainly those related to the cardiovascular system. In the past (18th–19th centuries), foxglove preparations were used to treat oedema, cardiovascular diseases, pneumonia, delirium tremens, epilepsy, haemorrhages and febrile conditions. Depending on the period and source, various forms of the medicine were used, including powdered leaves, infusions, decoctions, tinctures and extracts. However, the use of foxglove was associated with considerable variability in dosage, as well as with the risk of adverse effects and poisoning resulting from overdose. During World War II, County Herb Committees were established to collect medicinal herbs when German blockades created shortages; this included Digitalis purpurea which was used to regulate heartbeat.

== Gallery ==
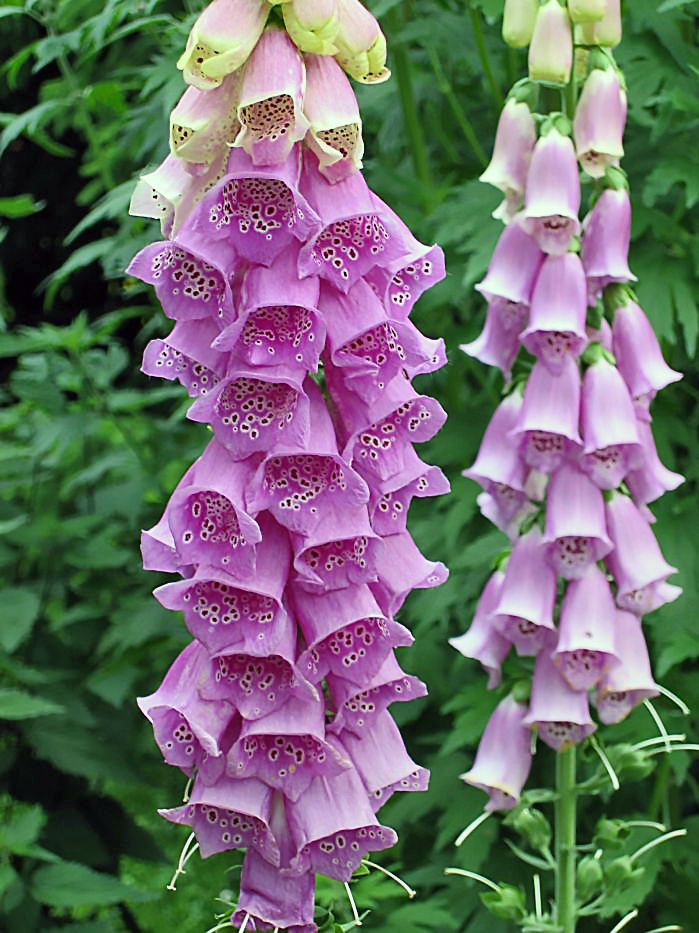

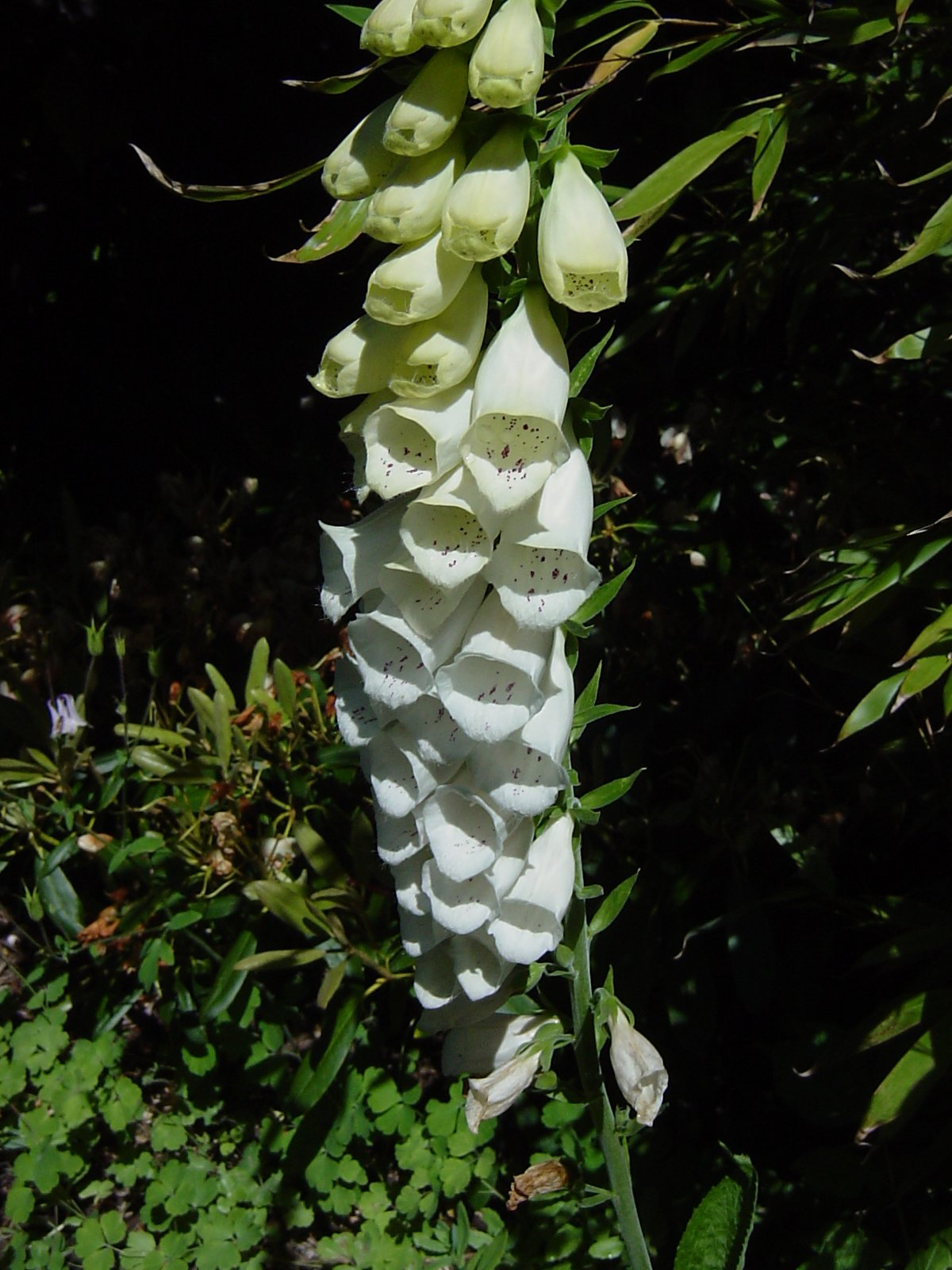
f.albiflora

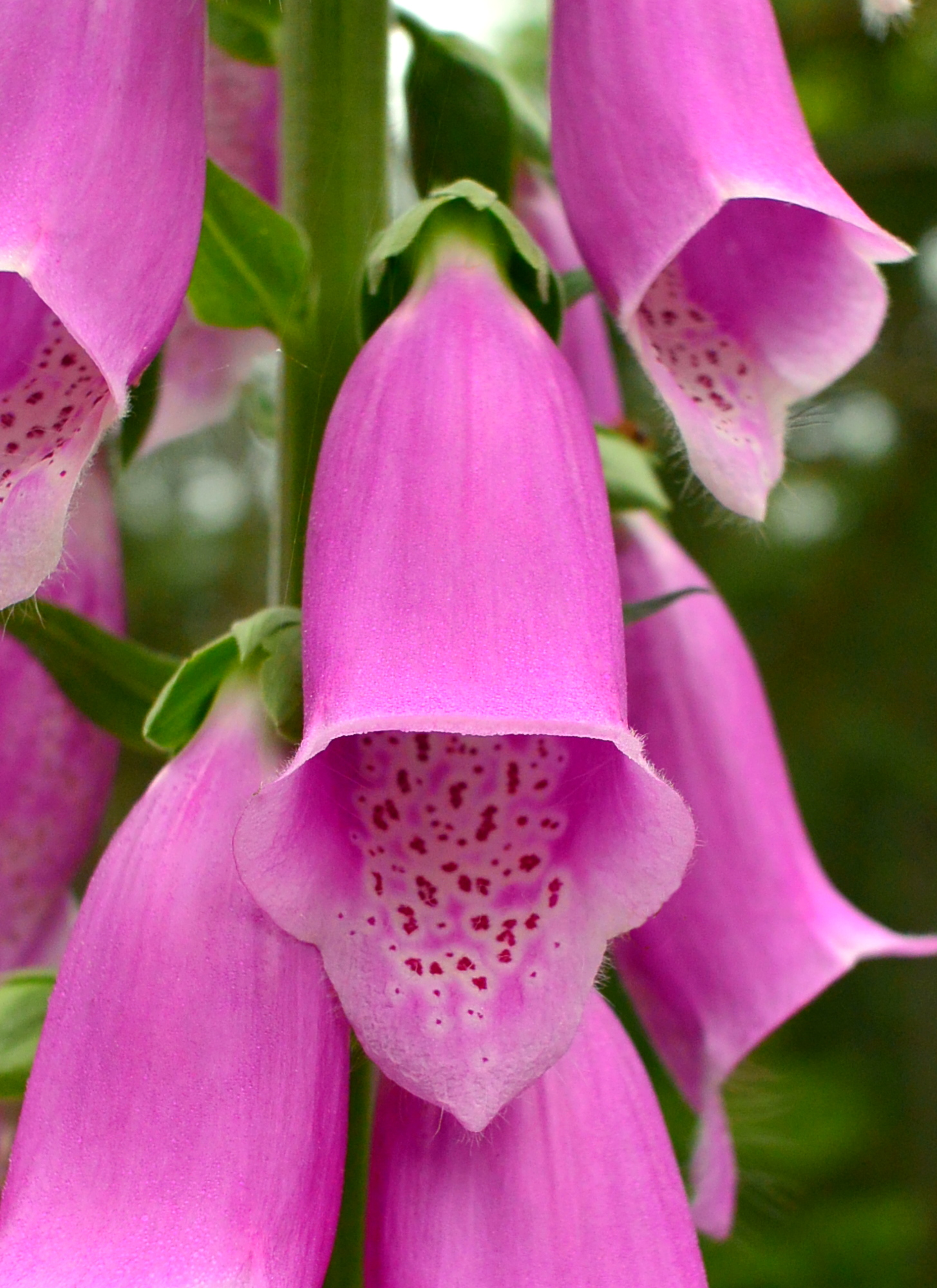
Close-up of flower

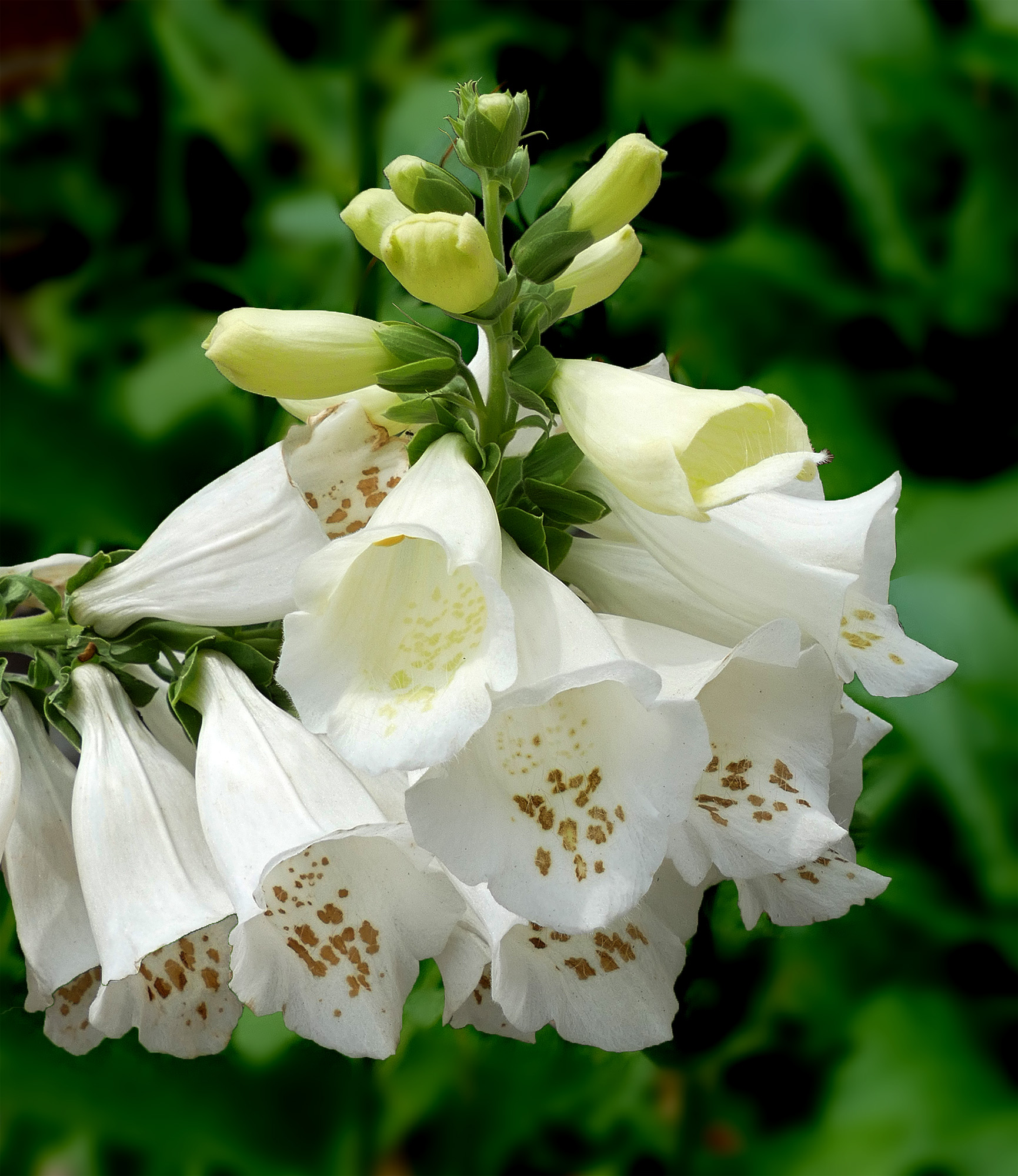
Close-up of white

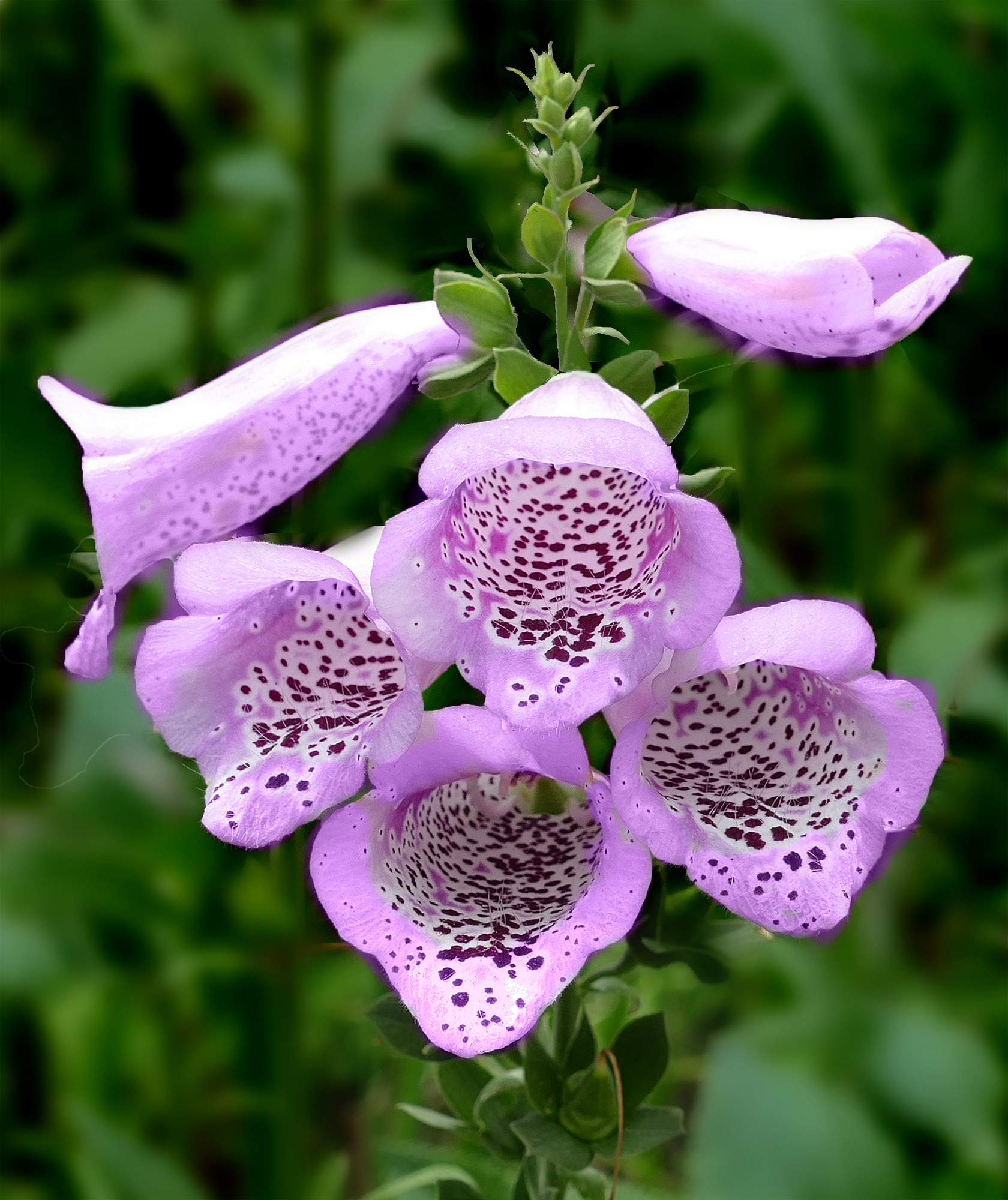
Close-up of light purple

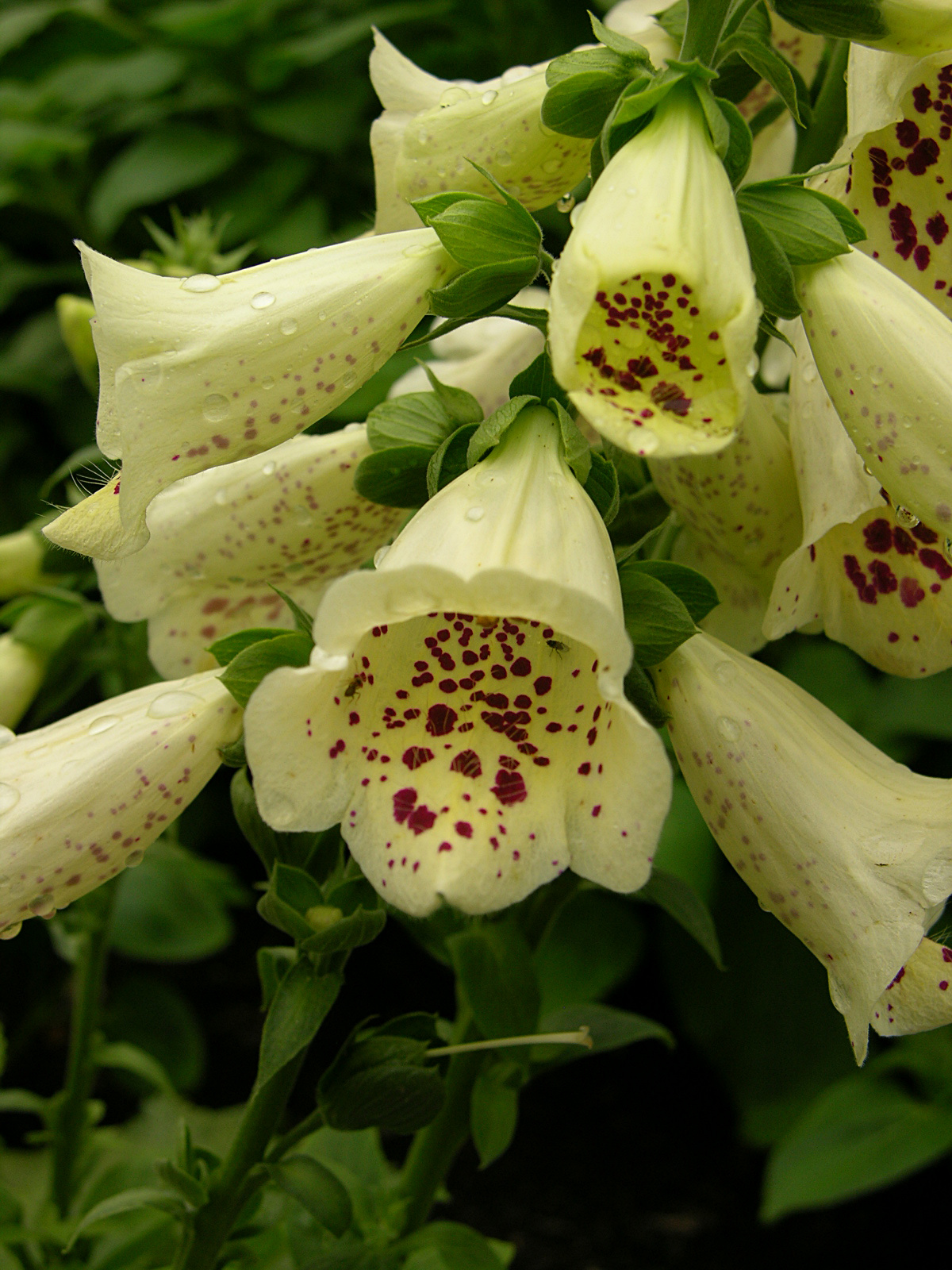
Flower close-up

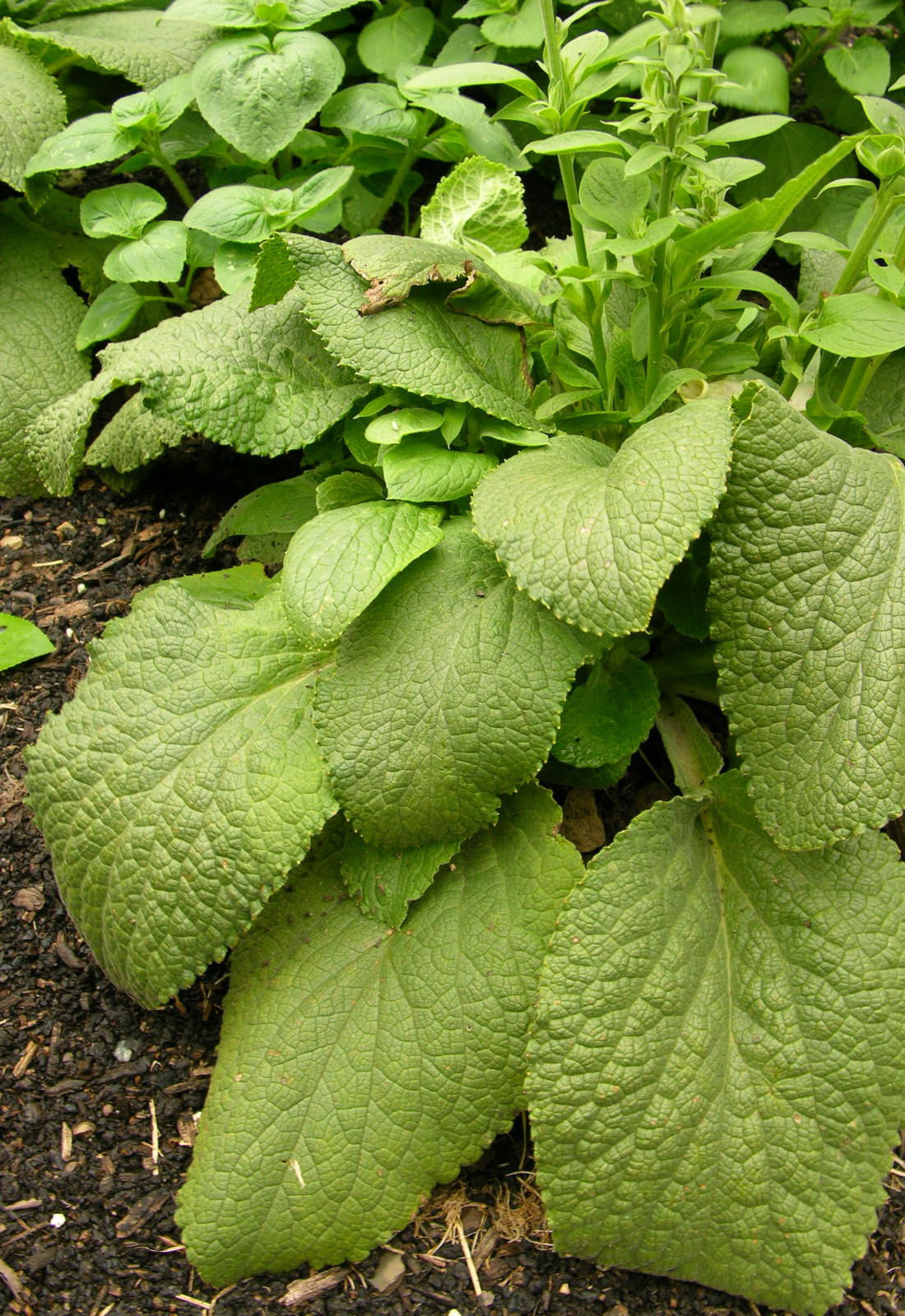
Leaves

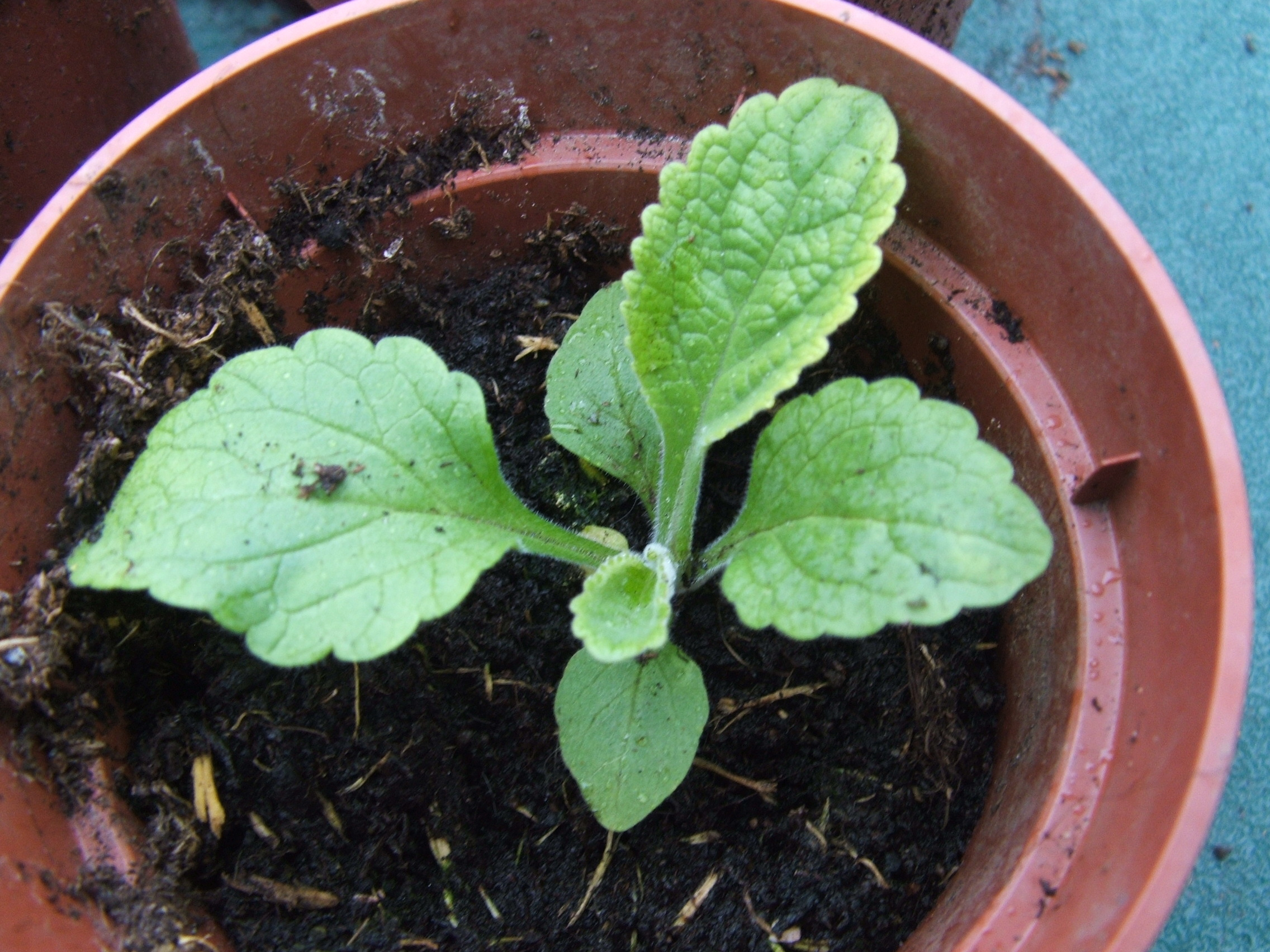
Young plant a few weeks old

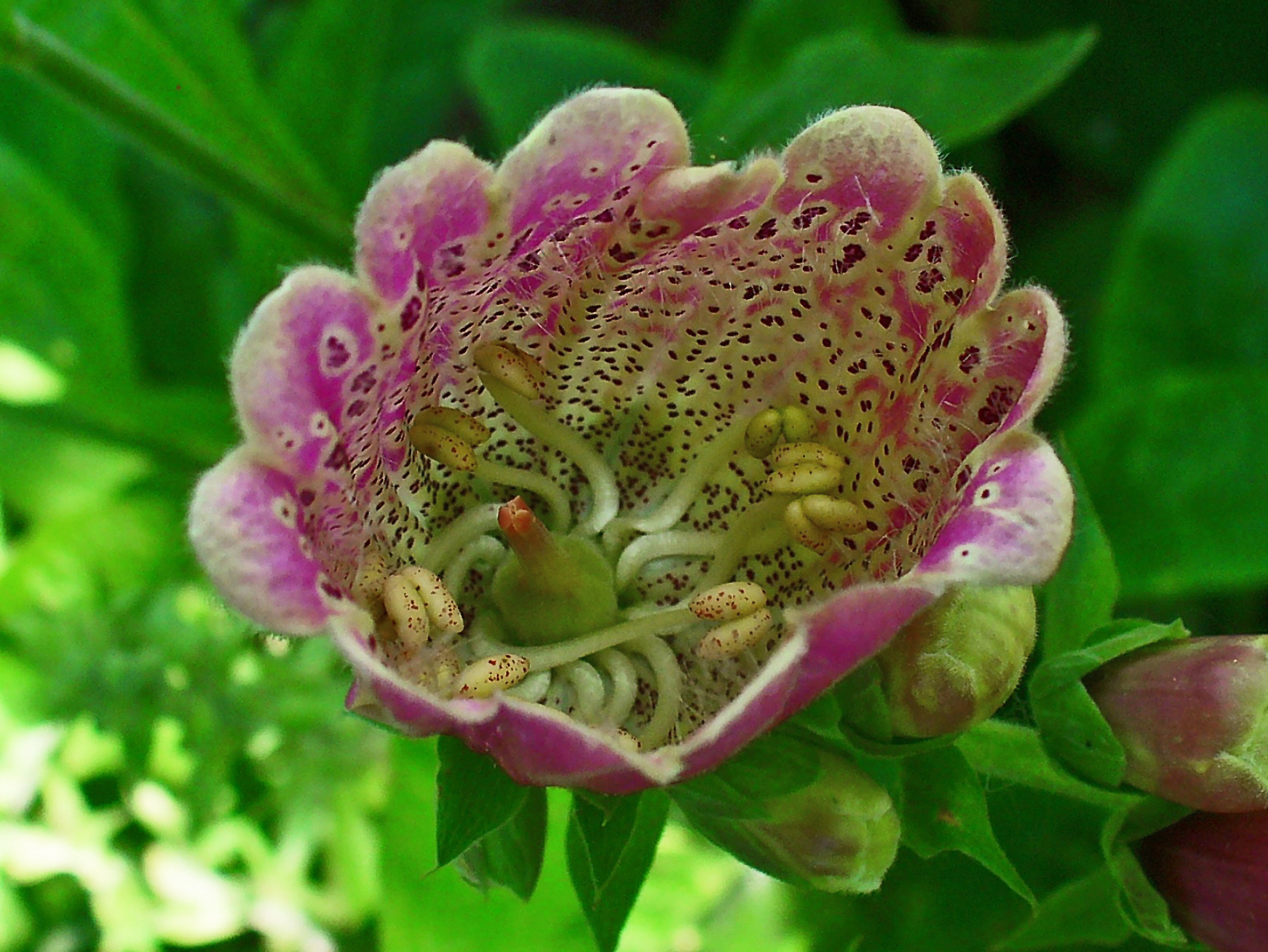
Giant flower demonstrating pseudo-peloria

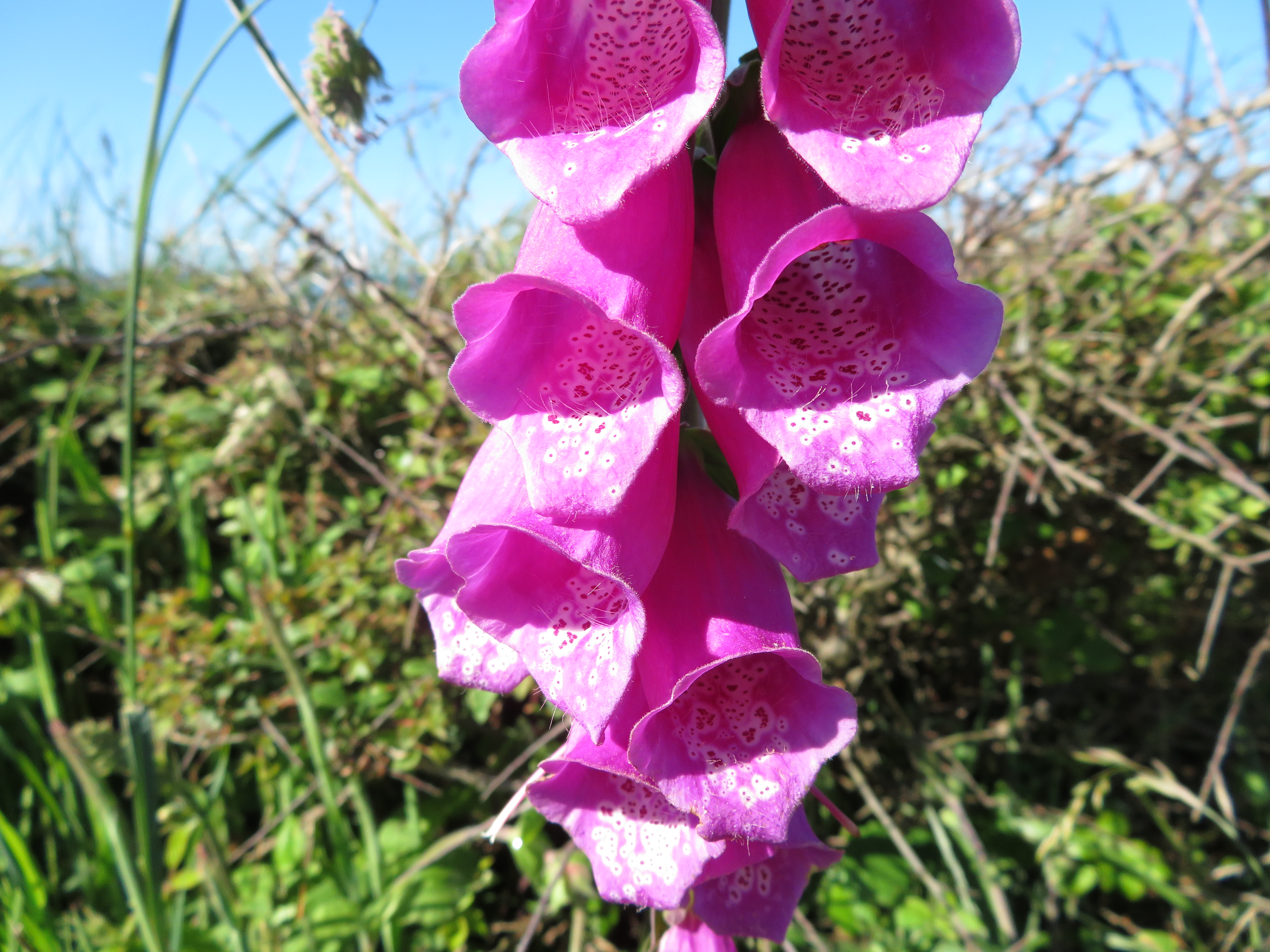
Detail

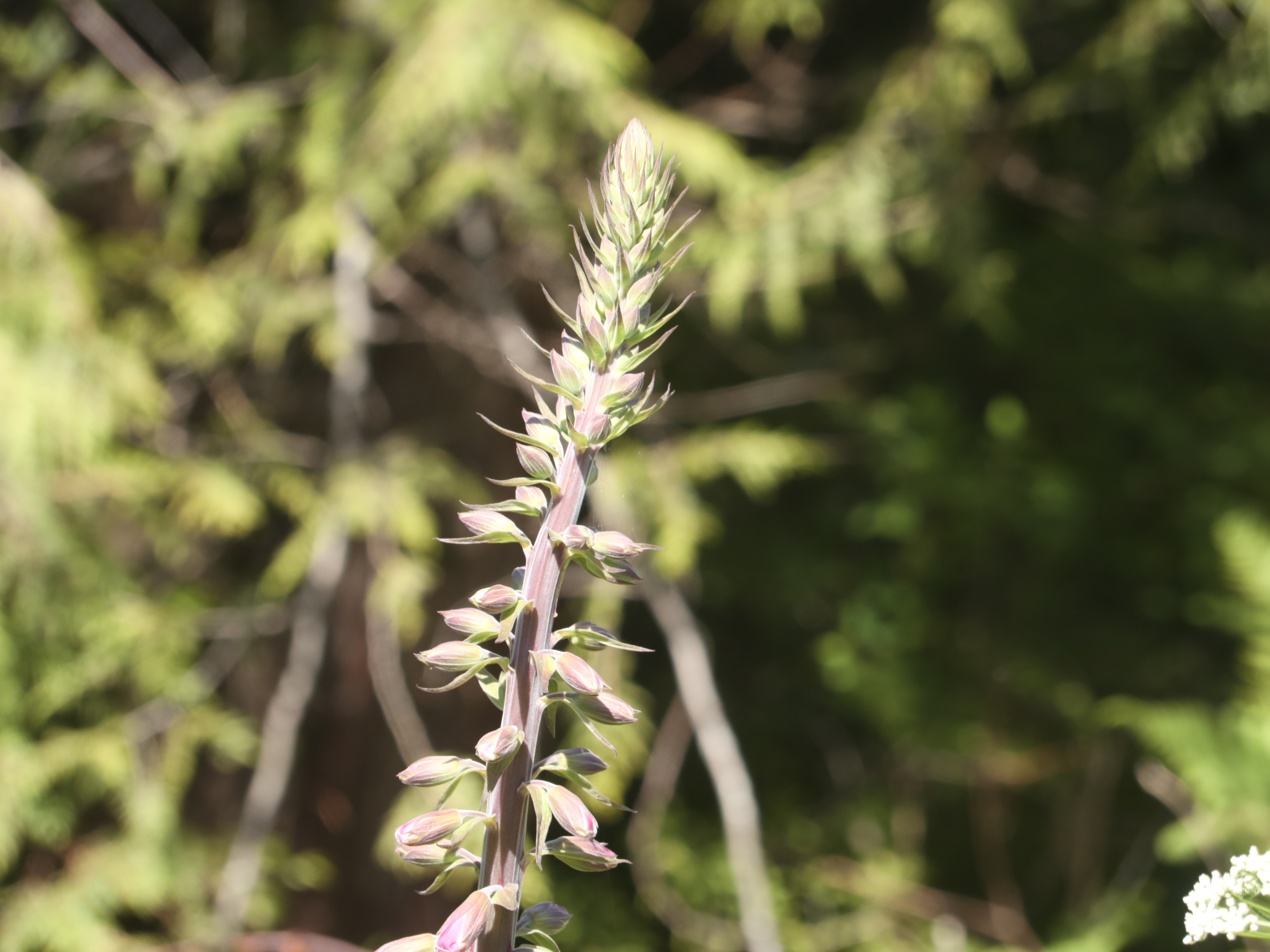
Terminal Buds

== See also ==
- List of poisonous plants

== Bibliography ==
- Flora Europaea: Digitalis purpurea
- Ecological flora of the British Isles: Digitalis purpurea
- Skye Flora: Digitalis purpurea
- Purple Foxglove USDA Invasive Plants of the US
