= County Herb Committee =

The County Herb Committees were a nationwide medicinal plant collecting scheme, established by the British Ministry of Health during the Second World War.

== History ==
The County Herb Committees were set up at a time when the German occupation of France and the disruption of shipping lanes interfered with drug supplies. As in the First World War, the British found that the Germans still largely dominated the pharmaceutical industry and consequently by the early 1940s there were critical shortages of essential medicines in hospitals and homes across Britain.

First the Vegetable Drugs Committee (VDC) of the Ministry of Supply was established in March, 1941, and the involvement of the Royal Botanic Gardens, Kew, was led by Dr. Ronald Melville, an economic botanist and pharmacist.

A total of 70 Committees were set up across England, Scotland and Wales, and grants of a total of £1,191 were made available to set up drying centres that could deal directly with trading companies. The first drying centre in Oxfordshire was in the home of Dr. W. O. James and his wife Gladys in the village of Islip, as well as in the Oxford Botanic Garden where they set up the Oxford Medicinal Plants Scheme. By the end of the war, there were 250 drying centres across country.

=== Guides for herb collectors ===
The committee found that a number of imported drugs were derived from plants that were also native to Britain. By 1941 they were publishing guides for herb collectors in the rural British communities. Various groups such as Boy Scouts, Girl Guides, Women's Institutes and the elderly, were enlisted as collectors by Sir Arthur William Hill, Director of Kew.

In 1941 the wholesale pharmaceutical company Brome and Schimmer published a booklet called Herb Gathering, describing the many roots, flowers and herbs needed by the Ministry of Health, and how to collect and dry them.

The National Federation of Women's Institutes cooperated with the Ministry of Supply and the County Herb Committees by collecting medicinal herbs. Horticulturist Elizabeth Hess was the Agricultural Organiser for the Women's Institute. The Ministry of Supply issued monthly bulletins for rural herb committees that provided information for collecting herbs in different areas. The first bulletin in 1942 described how in Derbyshire:

"The Hathersage Women's Institutes dried fifty pounds of materials chiefly nettles in the attic of a house, and the Clifton and Mayfield Boy Scouts dried seventy-six pounds of Foxglove at their headquarters. They hope to do much more this year and the county committee is looking around for drying depots."

The cardiac glycosides in foxgloves degrades if the plants are not dried carefully. A leaflet from Kew advised that collectors spread the plants on racks to dry in a coke-heated shed at 90-100 degrees Fahrenheit.

A pamphlet that the Vegetable Drugs Committee published in 1941 stated that the most essential medicinal plants needed were belladonna, colchicum, digitalis, hyoscyamus, stramonium and valerian, and that the countries of origin for these plants had previously been Hungary, Italy, Germany, and Yugoslavia.
