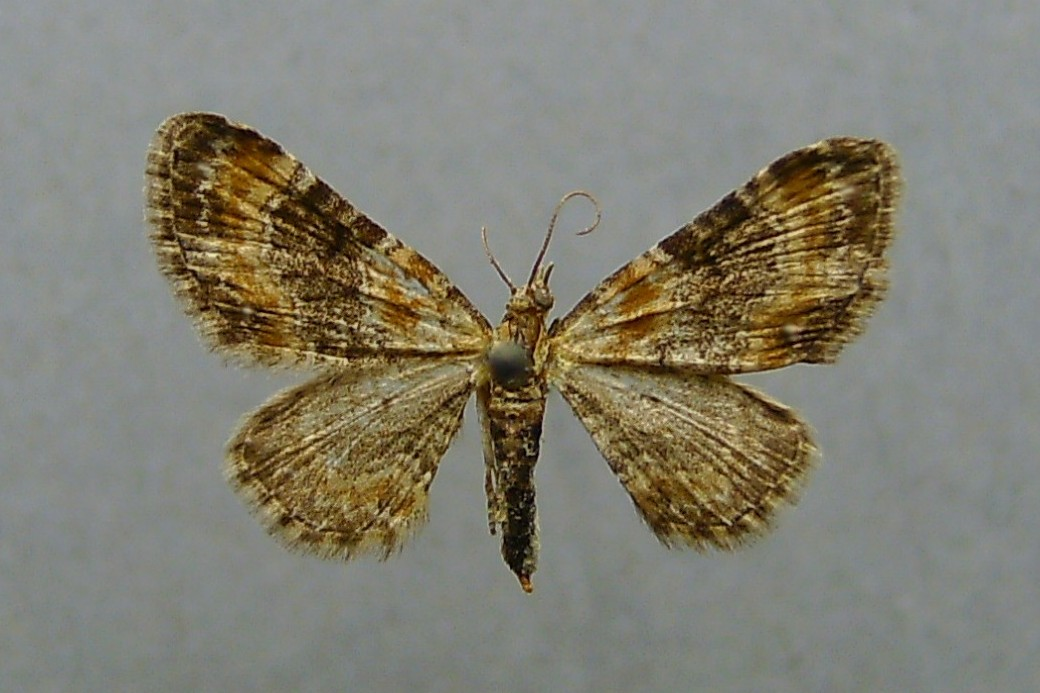

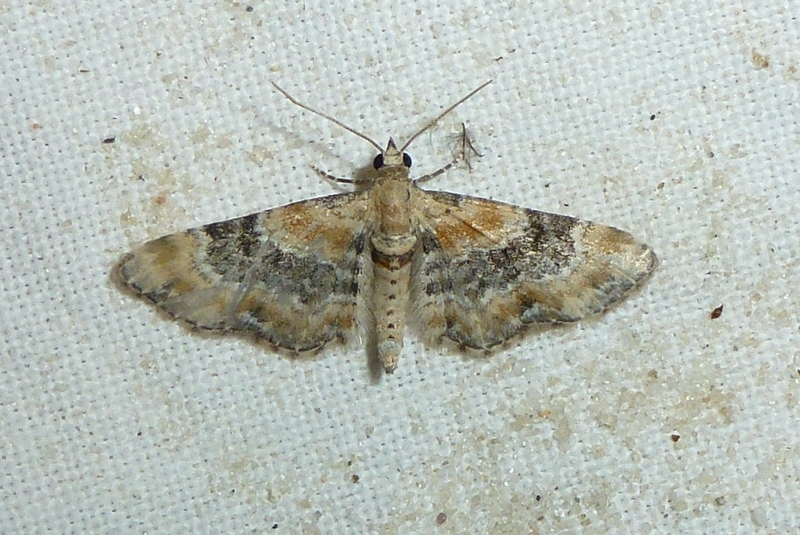

Scientific classification
- Kingdom: Animalia
- Phylum: Arthropoda
- Clade: Pancrustacea
- Class: Insecta
- Order: Lepidoptera
- Family: Geometridae
- Genus: Eupithecia
- Species: E. pulchellata

Binomial name
- Eupithecia pulchellata Stephens, 1831

Synonyms
- Eupithecia pulchellata var. digitaliata Dietze

= Foxglove pug =

Species of moth

The foxglove pug (Eupithecia pulchellata) is a moth of the family Geometridae found in Europe. It was described by the English entomologist James Francis Stephens in 1831.

== Description ==
The wingspan is 18–22 mm and the species is quite colourful for the genus, with alternating bands of dark brown and buffish orange on the forewings. In some races the buff bands can be very pale. There are dark crosslines. The ground colour of the forewings is yellow-red and shows a broad dark grey to dark brown, lightly edged central band, from which a black central spot hardly stands out. There are dark areas at the margin. The hind wings are slightly lighter than the forewings, have a darkened fringing edge and show a small black central spot.(The forewing is, from the inside outwards, coloured as follows: at the base dark grey, then a broad, ochre-yellow transverse band, then an even-broad, white-edged, dark grey transverse band, then whitish-yellow, then an irregular, brownish ochre-yellow transverse band (usually somewhat darker in colour than that further inside the wing), then a white zigzag transverse stripe and outermost grey.)

It flies at night in May and June and is attracted to light.

The larva is quite variable but is normally yellowish-green with purplish markings. It usually feeds inside foxglove flowers (Digitalis species). After hatching the larva bores through the side of the flower, sealing the mouth with silk and feeding on the reproductive parts of the flower, i.e. the stamen and developing seeds. Larva can be found from June to August by searching for discoloured flowers. The pupa overwinters in the soil, lasting through the winter to May and June. The corolla of the flower can persist on a plant long after uninfested flowers have fallen. Somewhat surprisingly, given this very specialized feeding ecology, it has also been recorded feeding on Brassica oleracea in Malta. The species overwinters as a pupa. The preferred habitat is the edge of woods, glades and park landscapes, gardens and warm mountain slopes.

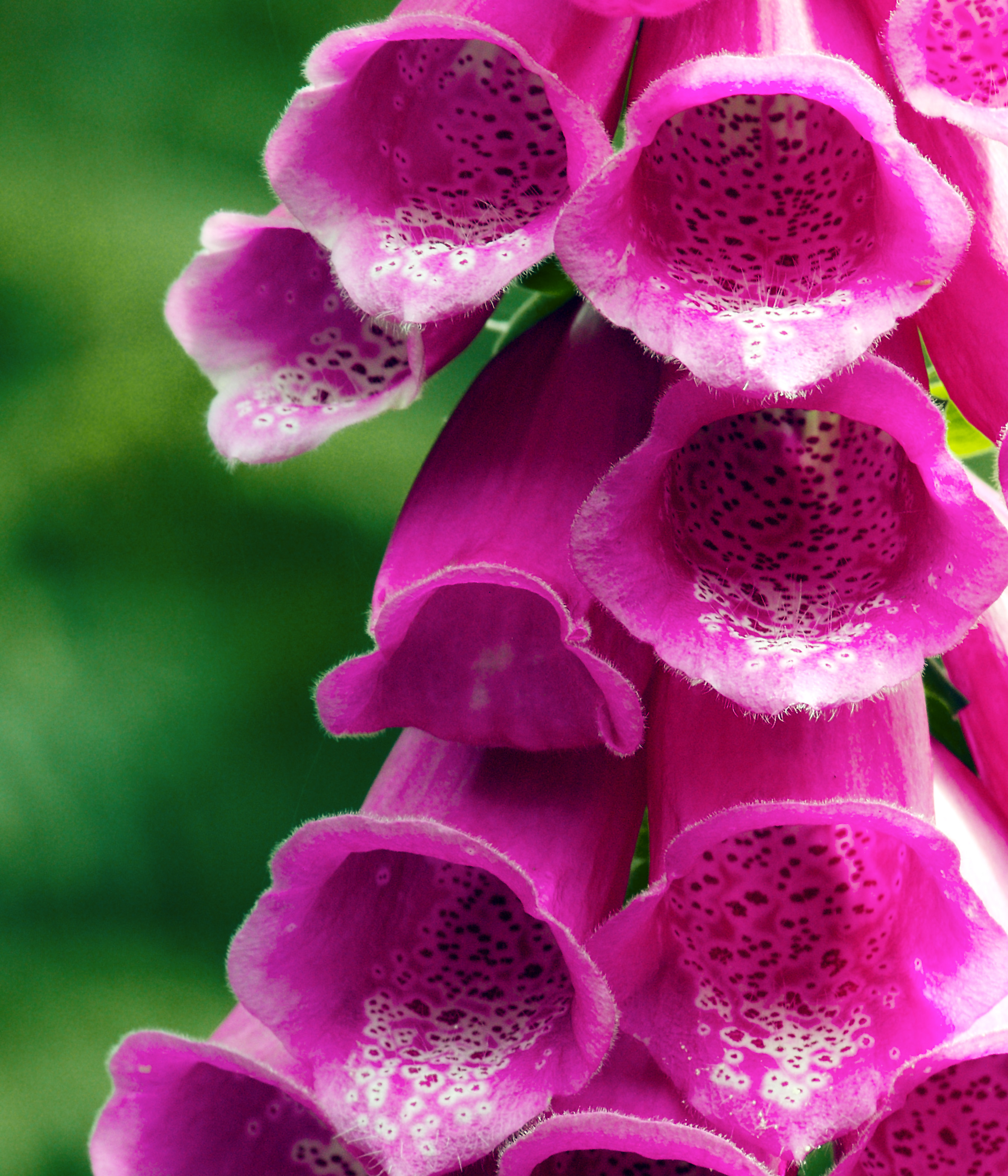
Closed flower of foxglove

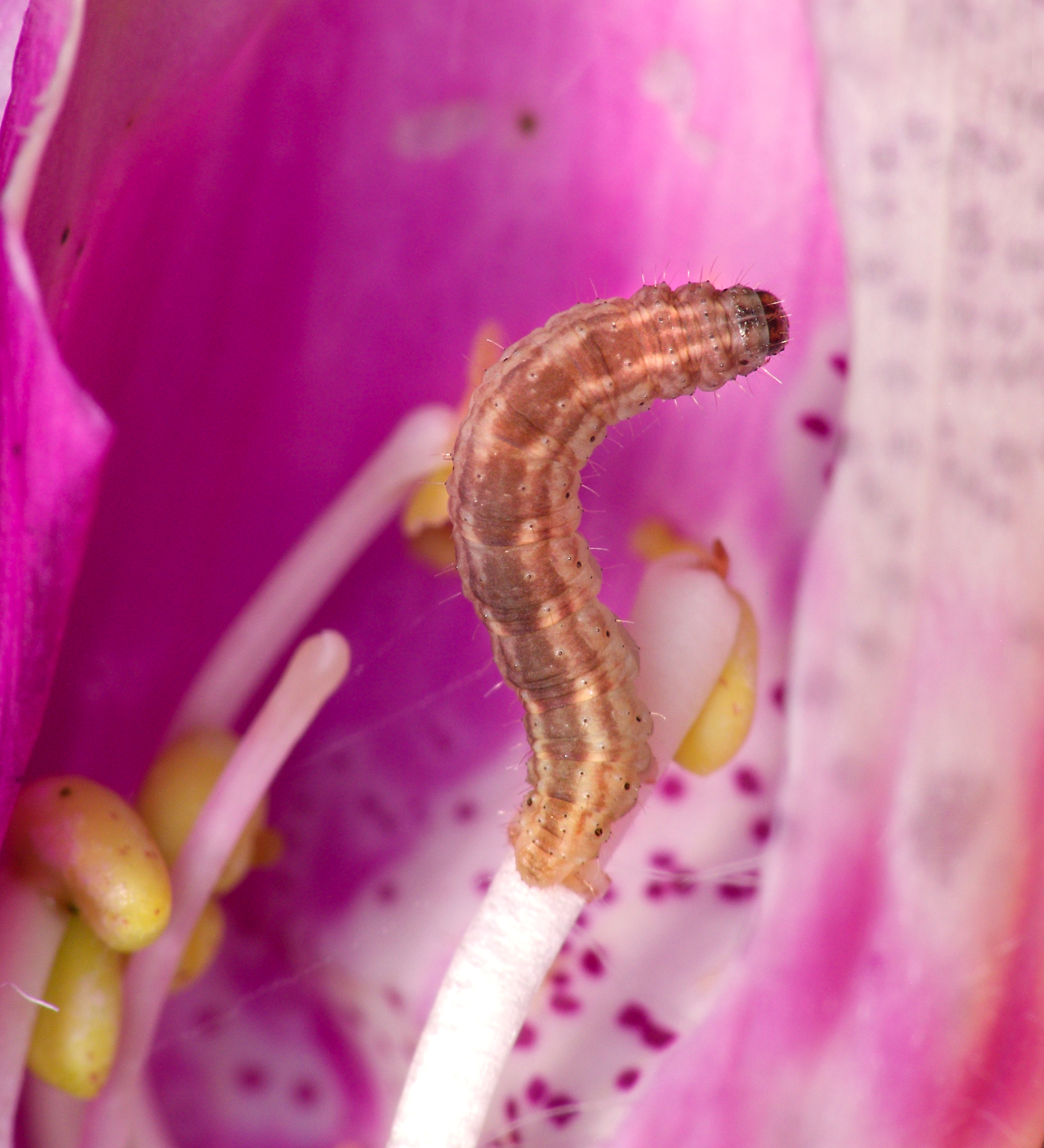
Larva

== Subspecies ==
- Eupithecia pulchellata pulchellata
- Eupithecia pulchellata grisearia Schwingenschuss, 1939
- Eupithecia pulchellata hebudium Sheldon, 1899
- Eupithecia pulchellata intermedia Dietze, 1913

== Distribution ==
It has a scattered distribution across Europe, closely following the range of its food plant. Where present it can be very common. The nominate subspecies E. pulchellata pulchellata is found in the British Isles, in Central Europe the subspecies is E. pulchellata intermedia. In the Pyrenees, it occurs to a height of 2,400 metres.
