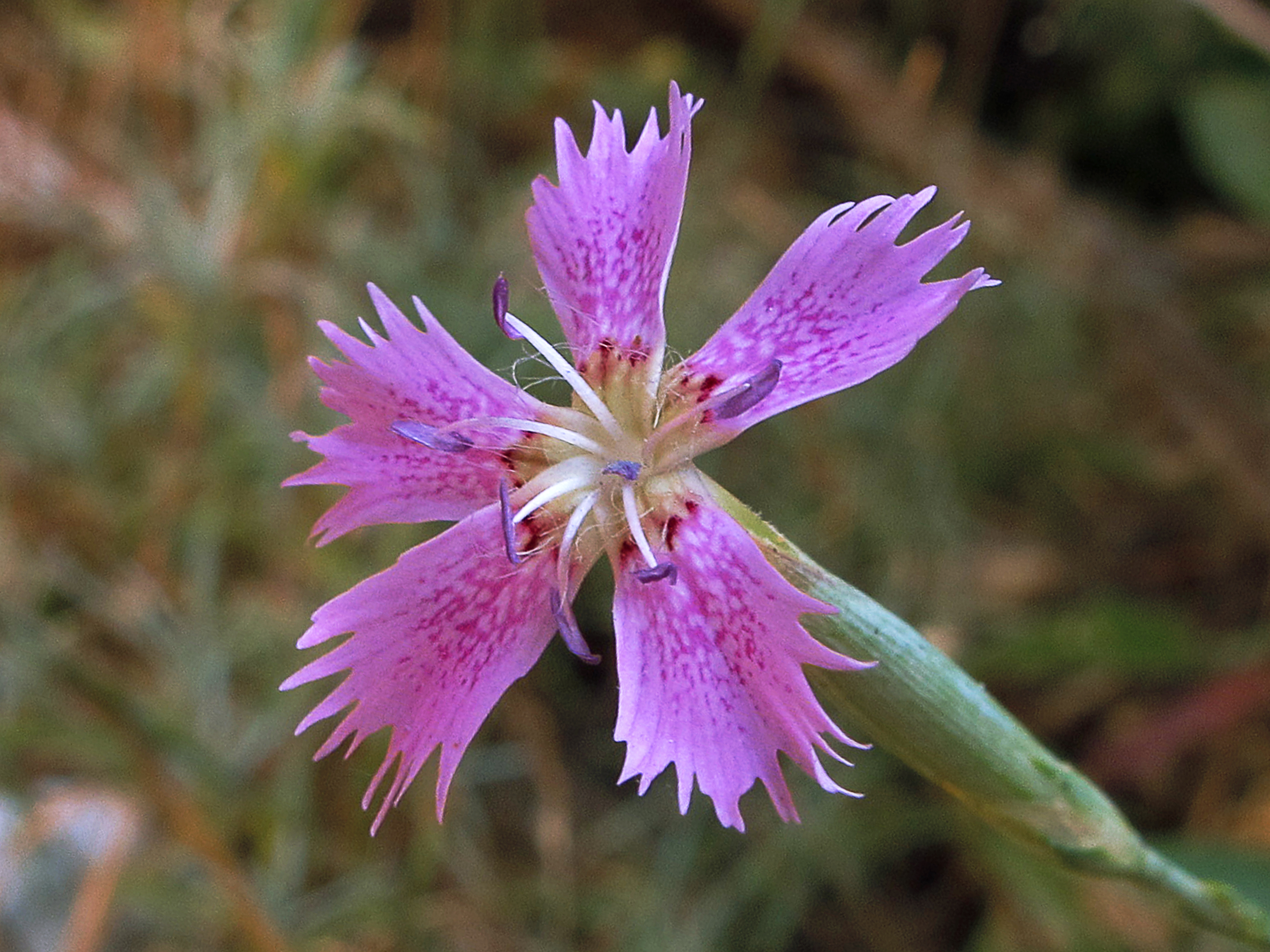
- Close-up of flower

Scientific classification
- Kingdom: Plantae
- Clade: Tracheophytes
- Clade: Angiosperms
- Clade: Eudicots
- Order: Caryophyllales
- Family: Caryophyllaceae
- Genus: Dianthus
- Species: D. lusitanus

Binomial name
- Dianthus lusitanus Brot.

Synonyms
- Dianthus bolivaris Sennen

= Dianthus lusitanus =

Species of flowering plant

Dianthus lusitanus is a species of Dianthus native to the Iberian Peninsula, and to the Atlas Mountains of Morocco and Algeria. A hardy tussock-forming perennial growing on rocky slopes, in times past its numerous stems were used to make brooms.

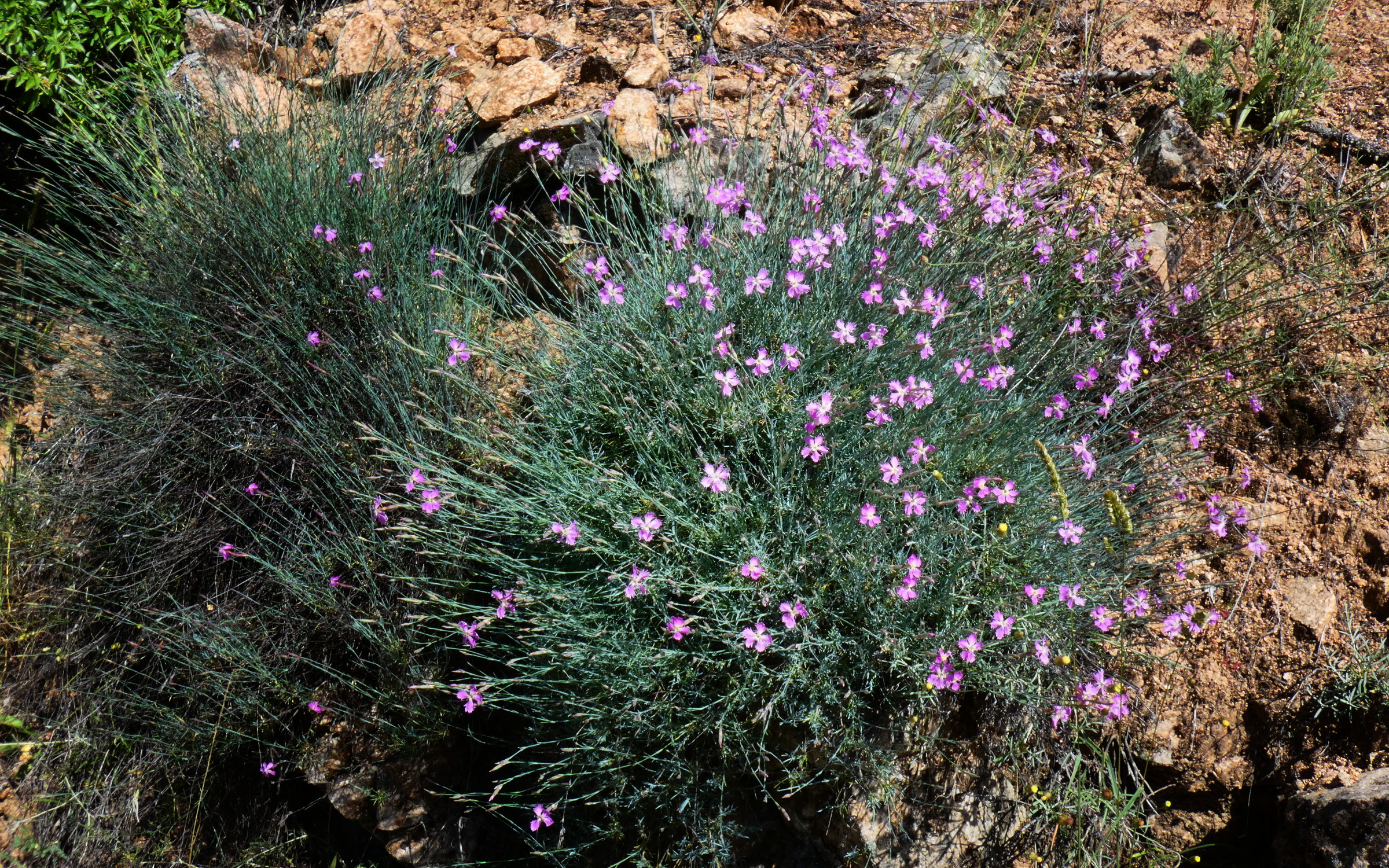
In its natural habitat

== Subspecies ==
A subspecies has been described:

- Dianthus lusitanus subsp. sidi-tualii (Font Quer) Dobignard
