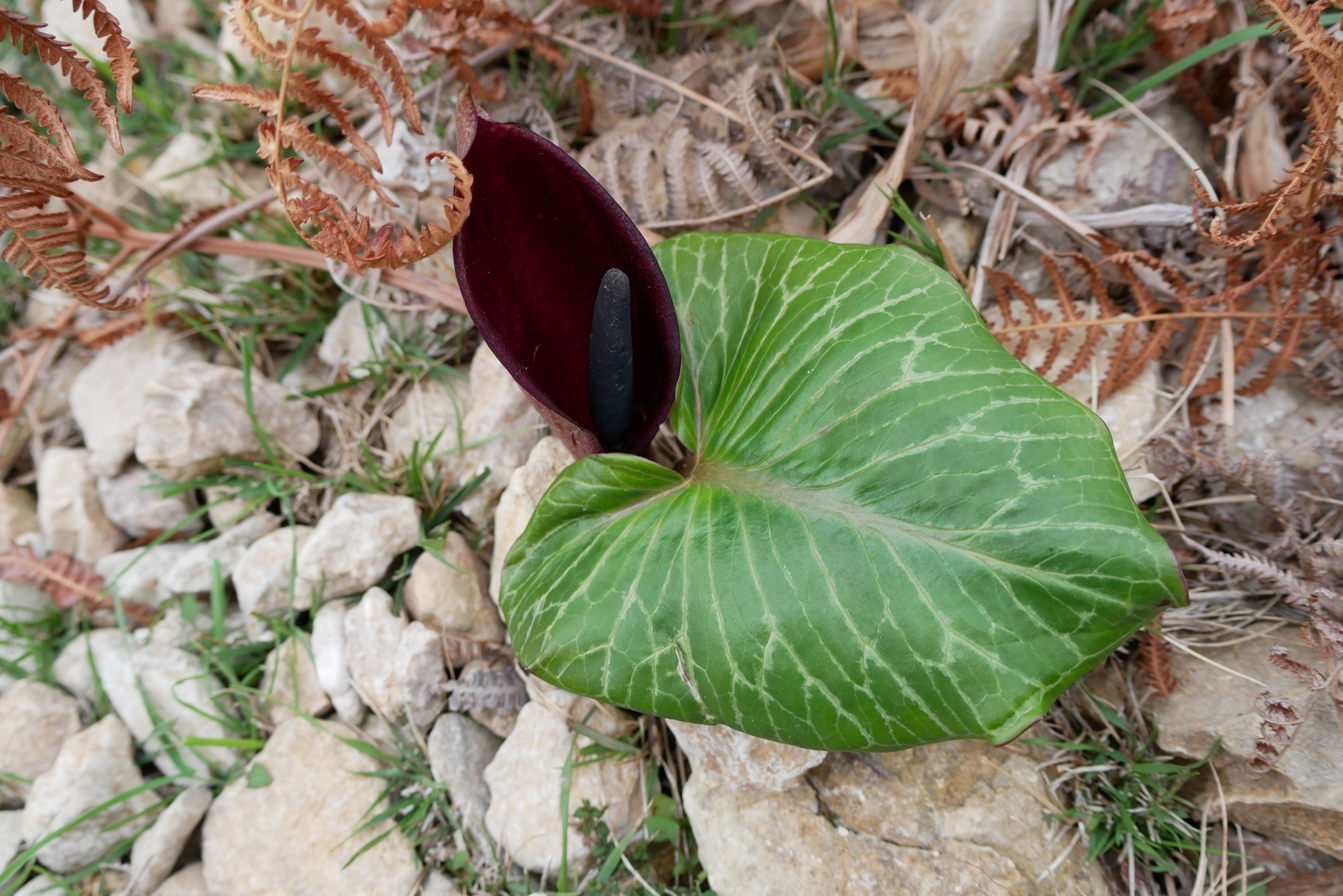
- Arum pictum in Mallorca

Conservation status
- Least Concern (IUCN 3.1)

Scientific classification
- Kingdom: Plantae
- Clade: Tracheophytes
- Clade: Angiosperms
- Clade: Monocots
- Order: Alismatales
- Family: Araceae
- Genus: Arum
- Species: A. pictum

Binomial name
- Arum pictum L.f., 1782

Synonyms
- Arisarum pictum (L.f.) Raf.; Gymnomesium pictum (L.f.) Schott; Arum balearicum Buc'hoz; Arum corsicum Loisel.; Arum pictum lusus bispathaceum Engl.; Arum pictum subsp. sagittifolium Rosselló & L.Sáez

= Arum pictum =

Species of flowering plant

Arum pictum is a plant of the arum family (Araceae). It is sister to all other species in the genus Arum, and is its only autumn-flowering member of the genus.

== Description ==
It is the only autumn-flowering plant of its genus.

== Distribution and habitat ==
The plant is native to the western Mediterranean in the Balearic Islands, Corsica, Sardinia, and Tuscany.

== Taxonomy ==
Arum pictum is the basal species of the genus Arum.

== Bibliography ==
- García Murillo, P.G. (2018). "Arum pictum". IUCN Red List of Threatened Species. 2018 e.T13133527A18611080. doi:10.2305/IUCN.UK.2018-1.RLTS.T13133527A18611080.en.
- Kew (2024). "Arum pictum L.f." Plants of the World Online.
- Quilichini, Angélique; Macquart, David; Barabé, Denis; Albre, Jérôme; Gibernau, Marc (2010-06-13). "Reproduction of the West Mediterranean endemic Arum pictum (Araceae) on Corsica". Plant Systematics and Evolution. 287: 179–187. doi:10.1007/s00606-010-0312-3. eISSN 1615-6110.
- Linz, Jeanine; Stökl, Johannes; Urru, Isabella; Krügel, Tamara; Stensmyr, Marcus C.; Hansson, Bill S. (2010-04-01). "Molecular phylogeny of the genus Arum (Araceae) inferred from multi–locus sequence data and AFLPs". Taxon. 59 (2): 405–415. Bibcode:2010Taxon..59..405L. doi:10.1002/tax.592006. eISSN 1996-8175.
- Boyce, Peter C. (2006). "Arum—a Decade of Change" (PDF). Aroideana. 29: 132–137. ISSN 0197-4033.
- Dring, J. V.; Kite, G. C.; Nash, R. J.; Reynolds, T. (January 1995). "Chemicals in aroids: a survey, including new results for polyhydroxy alkaloids and alkylresorcinols". Botanical Journal of the Linnean Society. 117 (1): 1–12. doi:10.1111/j.1095-8339.1995.tb02373.x. ISSN 0024-4074.
- Boyce, Peter C. (1993-05-14). The Genus Arum. Contributor: Kew Royal Botanic Gardens. London: HMSO. ISBN 0-11-250085-4.
- Hruby, Johann (1912). "Le genre Arum: Aperçu systématique avec considérations spéciales sur les relations phylogénétiques des formes" [The Genus Arum: A Systematic Overview with Special Considerations on the Phylogenetic Relations of its Forms]. Bulletin de la Société botanique de Genève II (in French) (4). Geneva: 113–160. ISSN 0366-3108.
