= Flora Iberica =

- Discipline: Botany
- Language: Spanish

Publication details
- History: 1980–present
- Publisher: Real Jardín Botánico de Madrid (Spain)

Standard abbreviations
- ISO 4: Flora Iber.

Links
- Journal homepage

Flora Iberica: Plantas vasculares de la Península Ibérica e Islas Baleares ("Vascular plants of the Iberian Peninsula and Balearic Islands") is a Spanish book series containing identification keys, descriptions, and illustrations of pteridophytes, gymnosperms, and angiosperms of Spain and Portugal (excluding Atlantic islands). It is published by the Real Jardín Botánico de Madrid.

Project born in 1980, the first volume appeared in 1986. As of 2021, 21 volumes have been published.

An abridged version, entitled Claves de Flora ibérica ("Keys for the Iberian Flora"), started being published in 2001.

== Publications ==
- Volume 1. Lycopodiaceae-Papaveraceae
- Volume 2. Platanaceae-Plumbaginaceae (partim)
- Volume 3. Plumbaginaceae (partim)-Capparaceae
- Volume 4. Cruciferae-Monotropaceae
- Volume 5. Ebenaceae-Saxifragaceae
- Volume 6. Rosaceae
- Volume 7(1). Leguminosae (partim)
- Volume 7(2). Leguminosae (partim)
- Volume 8. Haloragaceae-Euphorbiaceae
- Volume 9. Rhamnaceae-Polygalaceae
- Volume 10. Araliaceae-Umbelliferae
- Volume 11. Gentianaceae-Boraginaceae
- Volume 12. Verbenaceae-Callitrichaceae
- Volume 13. Plantaginaceae-Scrophulariaceae
- Volume 14. Myoporaceae-Campanulaceae
- Volume 15. Rubiaceae-Dipsacaceae
- Volume 16. Compositae
- Volume 17. Butomaceae-Juncaceae
- Volume 18. Cyperaceae-Pontederiaceae
- Volume 19(1). Gramineae (partim)
- Volume 19(2). Gramineae (partim)
- Volume 20. Liliaceae-Agavaceae
- Volume 21. Smilacaceae-Orchidaceae
