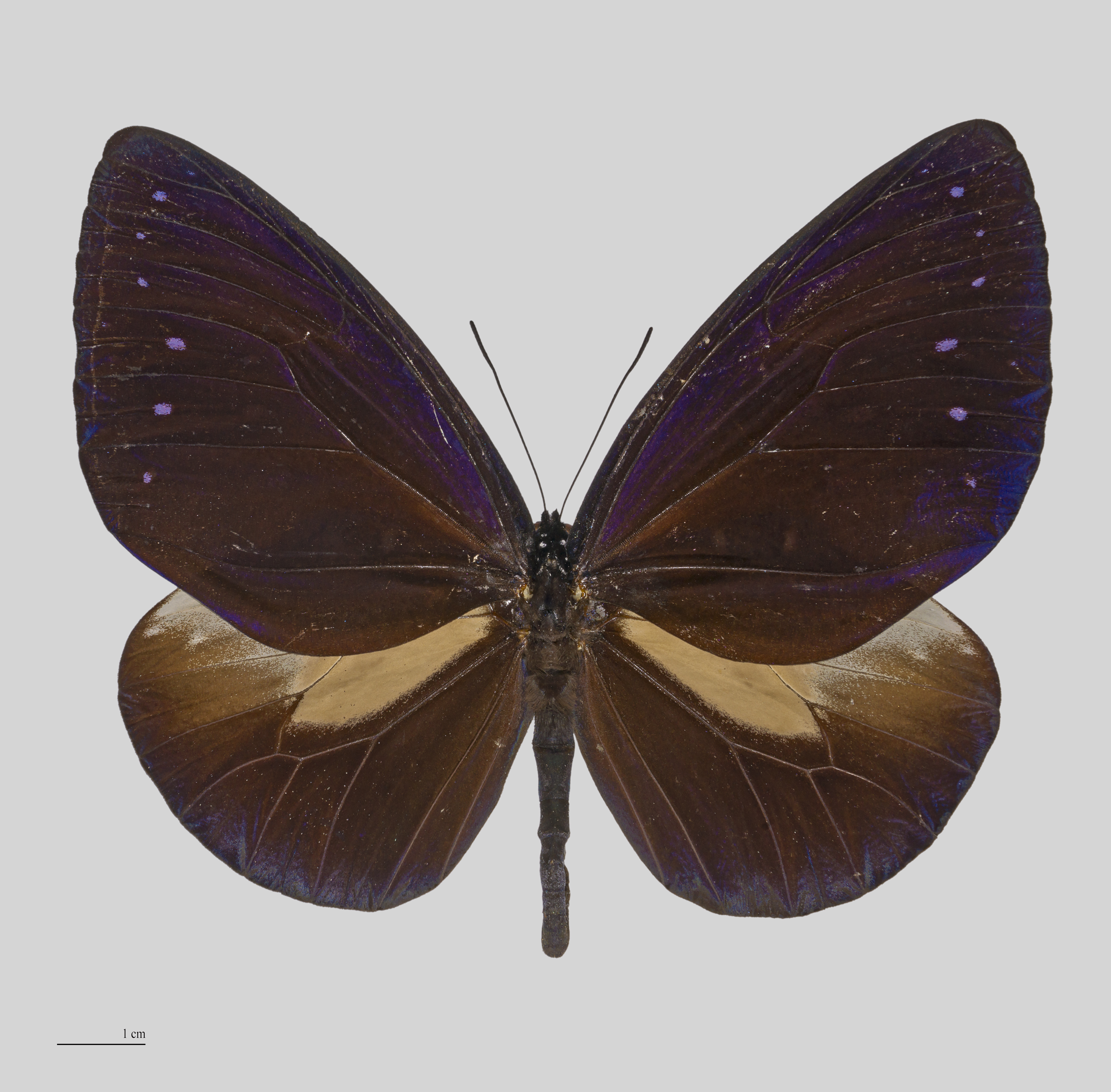
- Euploea phaenareta hollandi specimen

Scientific classification
- Kingdom: Animalia
- Phylum: Arthropoda
- Clade: Pancrustacea
- Class: Insecta
- Order: Lepidoptera
- Family: Nymphalidae
- Genus: Euploea
- Species: E. phaenareta

Binomial name
- Euploea phaenareta (Schaller, 1785)

Synonyms
- Papilio phaenareta Schaller, 1785; Papilio affinis Gmelin, 1790; Trepsichrois alea Hübner, 1816; Danais prothoe Godart, 1819; Danais cora Godart, 1819; Euploea gyllenhalii Lucas, 1853; Euploea cuvieri C. & R. Felder, [1865]; Euploea elisa Butler, 1866; Euploea callithoe var. fucosa Janson, 1886; Euploea durrsteini ab. nera Staudinger, 1895; Macroploea corus vitrina Fruhstorfer, 1898; Euploea grandis Moore, 1883; Euploea godmani Moore, 1883; Euploea majuma Ribbe, 1898; pauperata Fruhstorfer, 1910; luxurianta Fruhstorfer, 1910; privata Fruhstorfer, 1910; biplagiata Fruhstorfer, 1910; erynia Fruhstorfer, 1910; praestabilis Fruhstorfer, 1910; honrathi Fruhstorfer, 1910; Euploea callithoe morna Fruhstorfer, 1912; Euploea f. erynia Fruhstorfer, 1912; Euploea callithoe arova Fruhstorfer, 1913; Euploea callithoe admiralia f. aruana Strand, 1914; fucosa Hulstaert, 1931; pavettae Fabricius, 1938; goodsoni Corbet, 1942; rigneyi Jumalon, 1971; violescens Morishita, 1981; Papilio corus Fabricius, 1793; Euploea pavettae Zinken, 1831; Euploea callithoe Boisduval, 1832; Euploea hansemanni Honrath, 1888; Euploea durrsteini Staudinger, 1890; Euploea durrsteini Staudinger, 1891; eurykleia Fruhstorfer, 1910; Euploea castelnaui C. & R. Felder, [1865]; Euploea phoebus Butler, 1866; Euploea euthoë C. & R. Felder, [1865]; Euploea semicirculus Butler, 1866; Euploea mesocala Vollenhoven, 1872; Euploea unibrunnea Salvin & Godman, 1877; Euploea browni Salvin & Godman, 1877; Euploea althaea Semper, 1878; Euploea drucei Moore, 1883; Euploea butleri Moore, 1883; Euploea heurippa Godman & Salvin, 1888; Macroploea phaenareta micronesia Doherty, 1891; Euploea eucala Staudinger, 1896; Macroploea corus celebica Fruhstorfer, 1898; Euploea castelnaui var. salvini Staudinger, 1889; Macroploea corus locupletior Fruhstorfer, 1900; Macroploea phaenareta irma Fruhstorfer, 1903; Macroploea corus defiguratus Fruhstorfer, 1908; Euploea (Salpinx) juvia Fruhstorfer, 1908; Euploea callithoe admiralia Strand, 1914

= Euploea phaenareta =

Species of butterfly

Euploea phaenareta, the giant crow, is a butterfly in the family Nymphalidae. It was described by Johann Gottlieb Schaller in 1785. It is found in the Indomalayan realm and the Australasian realm.

== Subspecies ==
- E. p. phaenareta (Ambon, Serang)
- E. p. corus (Fabricius, 1793) (Sri Lanka, Burma)
- E. p. pavettae Zinken, 1831 (Java)
- E. p. callithoe Boisduval, 1832 (New Guinea, Louisiades, Goodenough, Fergusson, Woodlark, Kiriwina Islands)
- E. p. castelnaui C. & R. Felder, [1865] (Burma to Peninsular Malaysia, Langkawi, Singapore, Thailand)
- E. p. euthoe C. & R. Felder, [1865] (Aru, Kai)
- E. p. semicirculus Butler, 1866 (Bachan, Halmahera, Morotai)
- E. p. mesocala Vollenhoven, 1872 (Waigeu)
- E. p. unibrunnea Salvin & Godman, 1877 (eastern New Guinea, New Britain, Duke of York Island, New Ireland, Queen Charlotte Island, Feni Island)
- E. p. althaea Semper, 1878 (Philippines: Mindanao)
- E. p. drucei Moore, 1883 (Thailand, Vietnam)
- E. p. butleri Moore, 1883 (Borneo)
- E. p. phaeretena Kheil, 1884 (Nias)
- E. p. heurippa Godman & Salvin, 1888 (Solomon Islands)
- E. p. micronesia (Doherty, 1891) (Enggano)
- E. p. eucala Staudinger, 1896 (Sumbawa, Flores, Sumba)
- E. p. celebica (Fruhstorfer, 1898) (Sulawesi)
- E. p. salvini Staudinger, 1889 (Palawan)
- E. p. locupletior (Fruhstorfer, 1900) (Talaud Island)
- E. p. irma (Fruhstorfer, 1903) (Obi)
- E. p. hollandi Fruhstorfer, 1904 (Buru)
- E. p. rolanda Fruhstorfer, 1904 (Sula Island)
- E. p. defiguratus (Fruhstorfer, 1908) (Bali)
- E. p. juvia Fruhstorfer, 1908 (Taiwan)
- E. p. sacerdotalis Fruhstorfer, 1910 (Jobi)
- E. p. nikrion Fruhstorfer, 1910 (Bawean)
- E. p. hesiodus Fruhstorfer, 1910 (Bangka)
- E. p. statius Fruhstorfer, 1910 (Sumatra)
- E. p. admiralia Strand, 1914 (Admiralty Islands)
- E. p. ornae Schröder & Treadaway, 1979 (Philippines: Samar)

== Biology ==
The larva feeds on Cerbera - C. floribunda, C. manghas, and Plumeria species.
