= Cassowary (disambiguation) =

Cassowary is a large flightless bird native to Australia and New Guinea.

Cassowary may also refer to:

- Cassowary (software), a toolkit to solve equations on a computer
- Cassowary plum, Cerbera floribunda, poisonous plant
- Cassowary Coast Region, local government in Queensland
