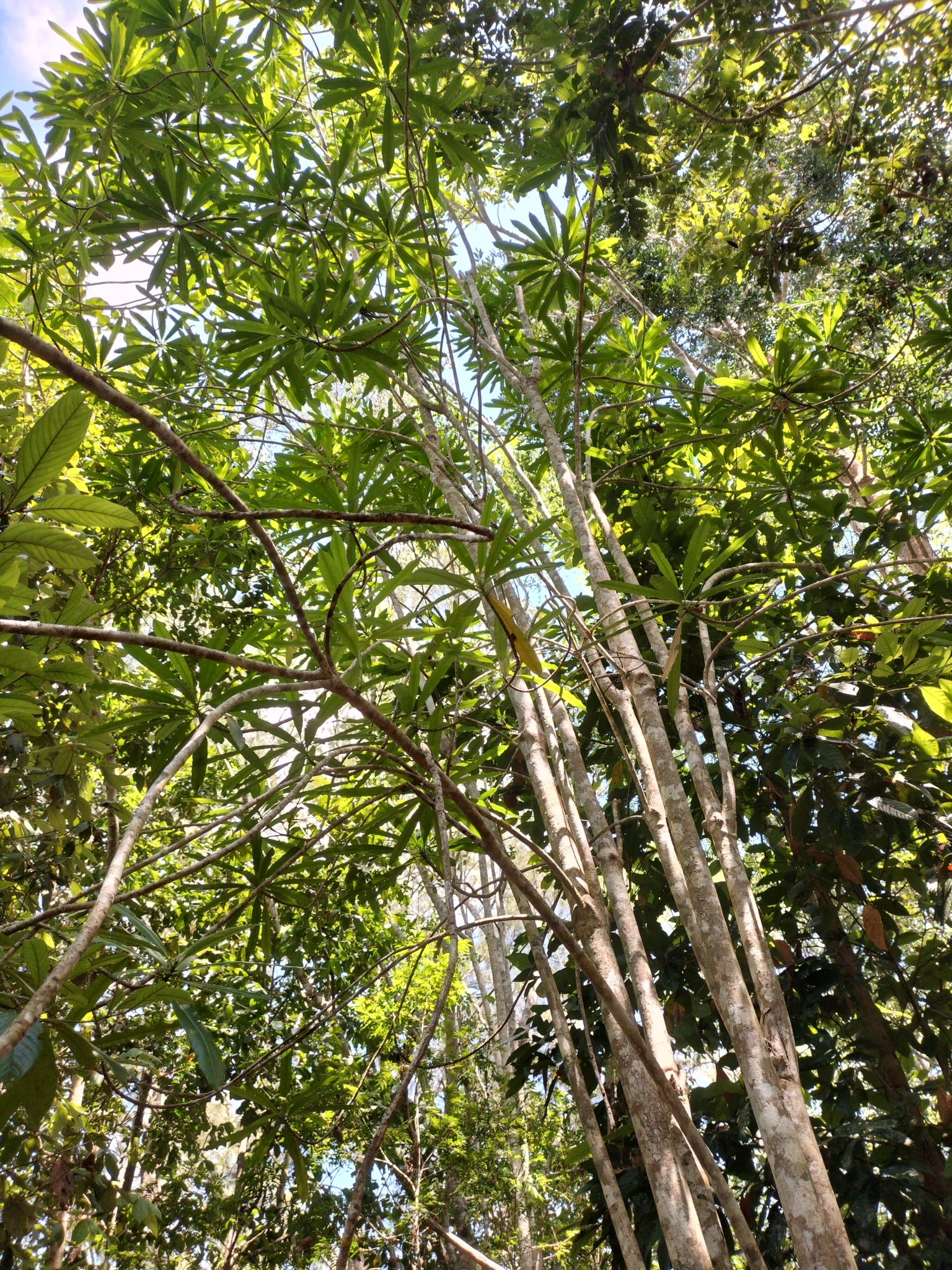

Conservation status
- Least Concern (IUCN 3.1)

Scientific classification
- Kingdom: Plantae
- Clade: Tracheophytes
- Clade: Angiosperms
- Clade: Eudicots
- Clade: Asterids
- Order: Gentianales
- Family: Apocynaceae
- Genus: Cerbera
- Species: C. inflata

Binomial name
- Cerbera inflata S.T.Blake

Synonyms
- Cerbera manghas auct. non L.

= Cerbera inflata =

Cassowary plum

Species of flowering plant

Cerbera inflata, commonly known as the cassowary plum, grey milkwood, Joojooga, or rubber tree, is a plant in the family Apocynaceae endemic to northeast Queensland, specifically the Atherton Tableland and adjacent areas.

== Description ==
Cerbera inflata is a tree up to 30 m (98 ft) in height with a grey fissured trunk, and with no buttress roots. Leaves are glabrous (smooth), lanceolate, dull green above and paler below. They are arranged in whorls and crowded towards the end of the twigs. They measure up to 26 cm (10 in) long and 3 cm (1.2 in) wide, with about 35 lateral veins. All parts of the tree produces a copious milky sap when cut.

The inflorescence is a much branched cyme up to 15 cm (6 in) with usually more than 50 flowers. The flowers have 5 white sepals, a long corolla tube about 16 mm (0.6 in) in length by 2 mm (0.08 in) wide with 5 free lobes at the end. They are white with a cream or green centre, about 15 mm (0.6 in) in diameter, and have a sweet scent.

Fruits are a bright blue-purple drupe measuring about 7 cm (2.8 in) long by 3 cm (1.2 in) wide, bluntly rounded at the base (the end attached to the branch) and slightly pointed at the apex. They each contain a single large seed.

== Taxonomy ==
This species was first described as Cerbera dilatata by the Australian botanist Stanley Thatcher Blake, and published in 1948 in the Proceedings of the Royal Society of Queensland. That name was subsequently found to be a nomen illegitimum as it had previously been applied to a plant from the Caroline and Mariana Islands in 1927, (and is now a synonym of Cerbera odollam). Thus it was necessary that this species be renamed, and in 1959 botanist Paul Irwin Forster published a revision of the Australian members of the genus Cerbera, in which he gave this plant its current combination. Any historical collections or observations from Australia that are labelled C. dilatata will be referring to the species C. inflata, while those from outside Australia refer to C. odollam.

=== Etymology ===
The species epithet derives from the Latin inflatus, meaning 'inflated' and refers to the corolla tube.

== Distribution and habitat ==
Cerbera inflata is endemic to Queensland. It grows in well developed rainforest in the foothills and uplands from Innisfail to the Atherton Tableland. The altitudinal range is from 100 to 800 m (330 to 2,620 ft).

== Conservation ==
This species has been assessed as having a conservation status of least concern by the International Union for Conservation of Nature (IUCN) and by the Queensland Government under its Nature Conservation Act. The IUCN cites a wide geographic range and a lack of perceived threats as the basis for their assessment.

== Ecology ==
Cassowaries eat the fallen fruit whole, and are the major dispersal agent for the species.

== Gallery ==
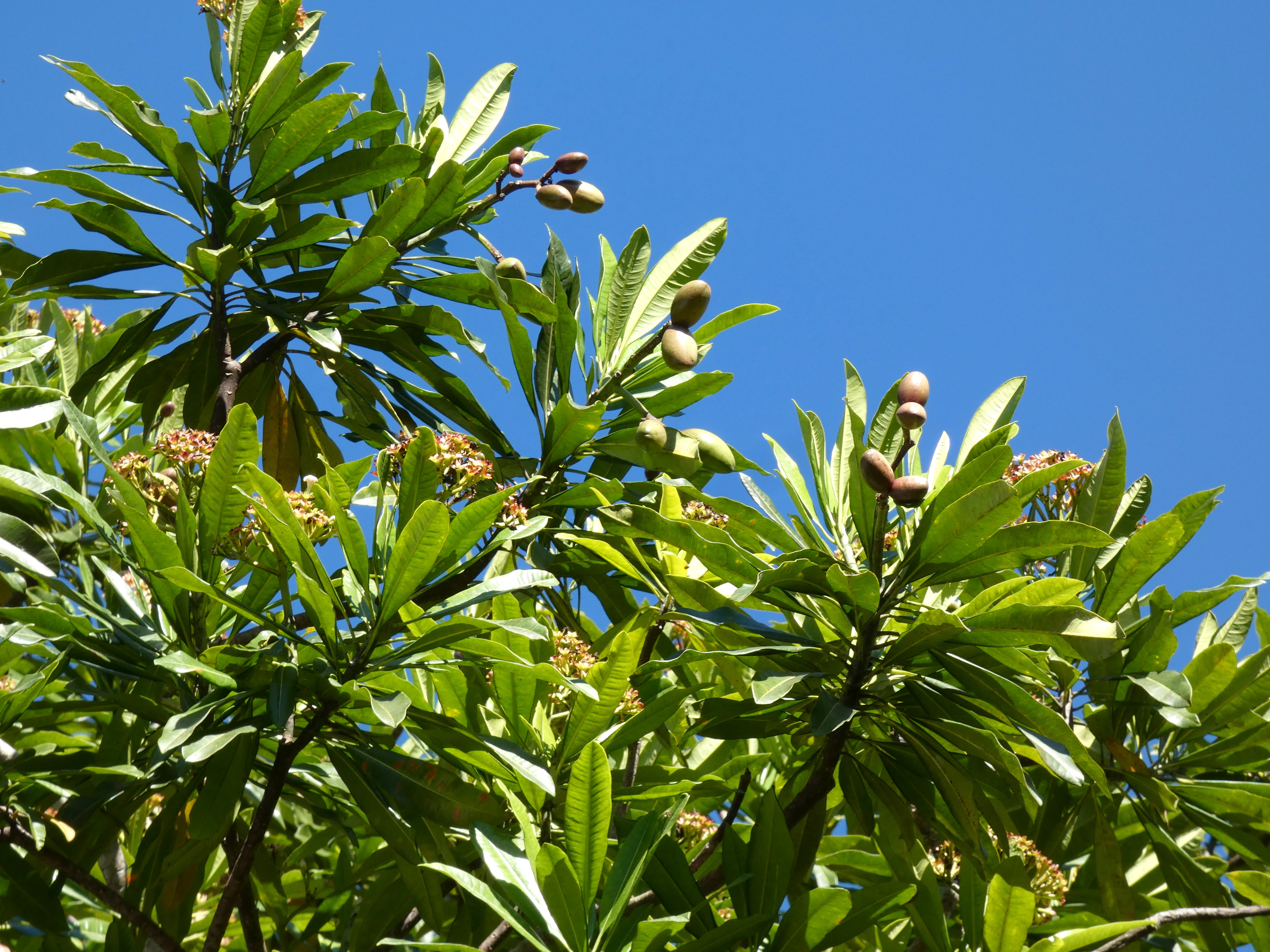
Foliage, flowers and fruit

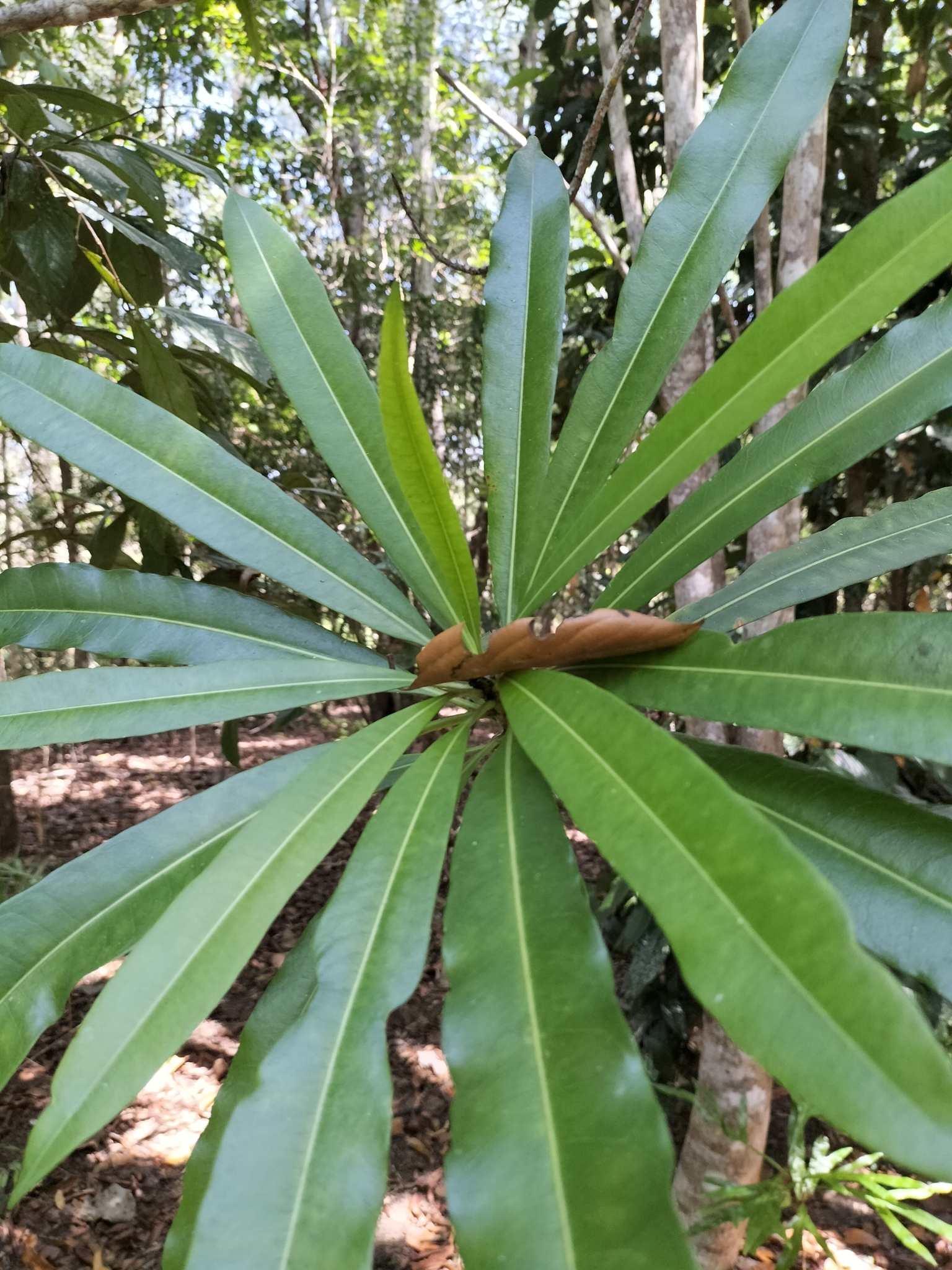
Spirally arranged leaves

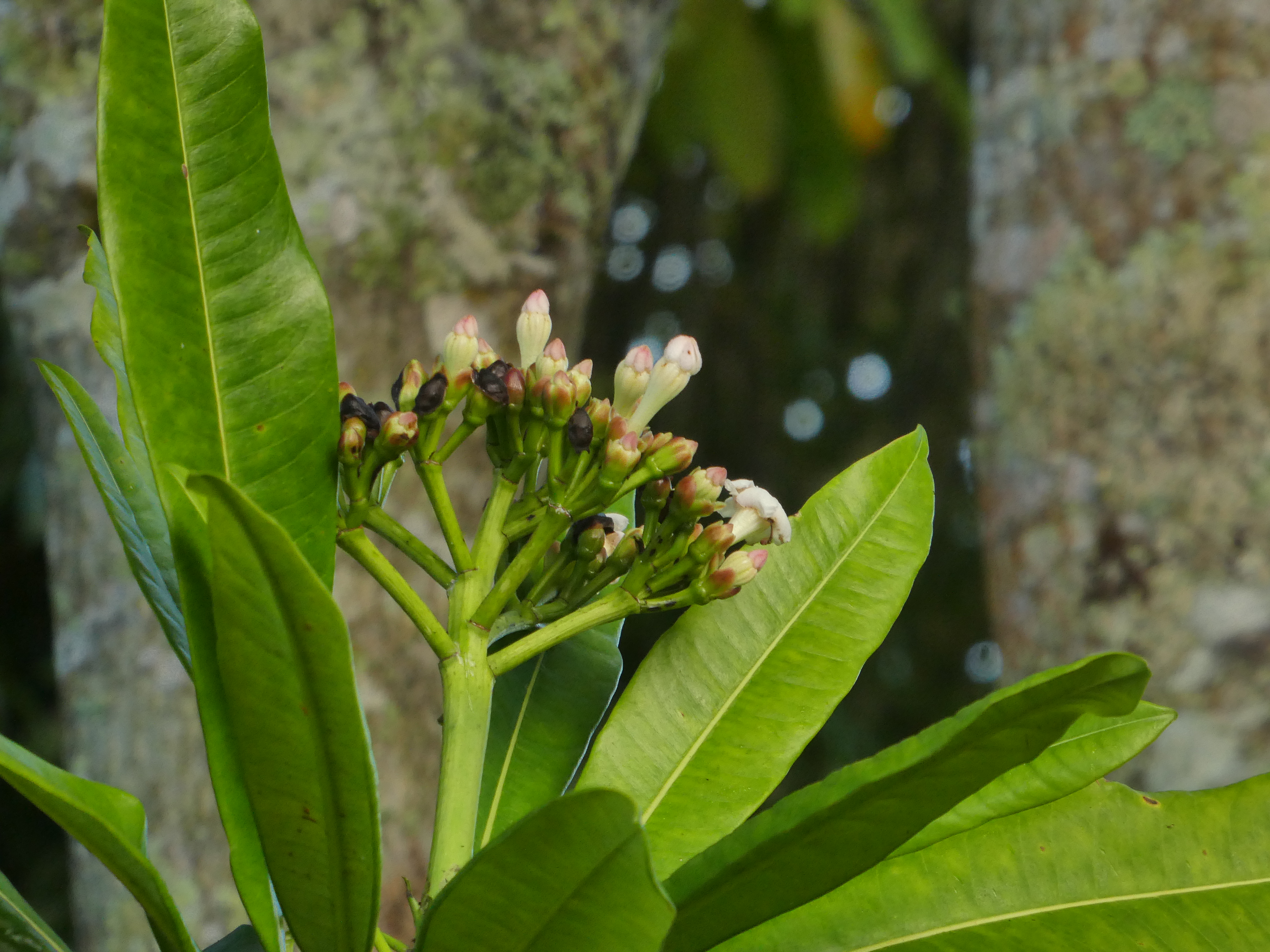
Inflorescence

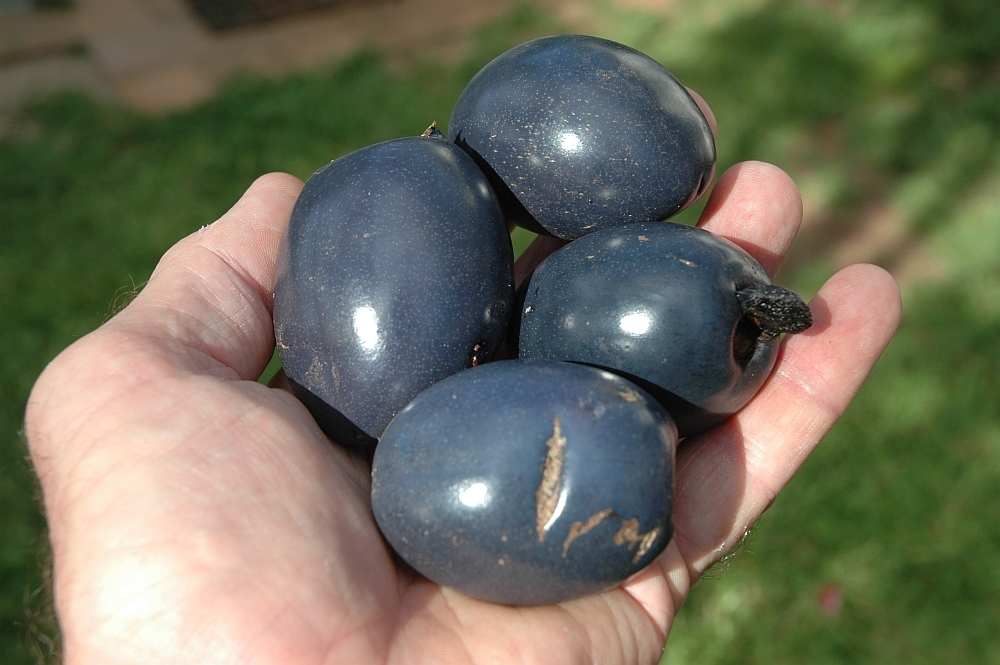
Fruit

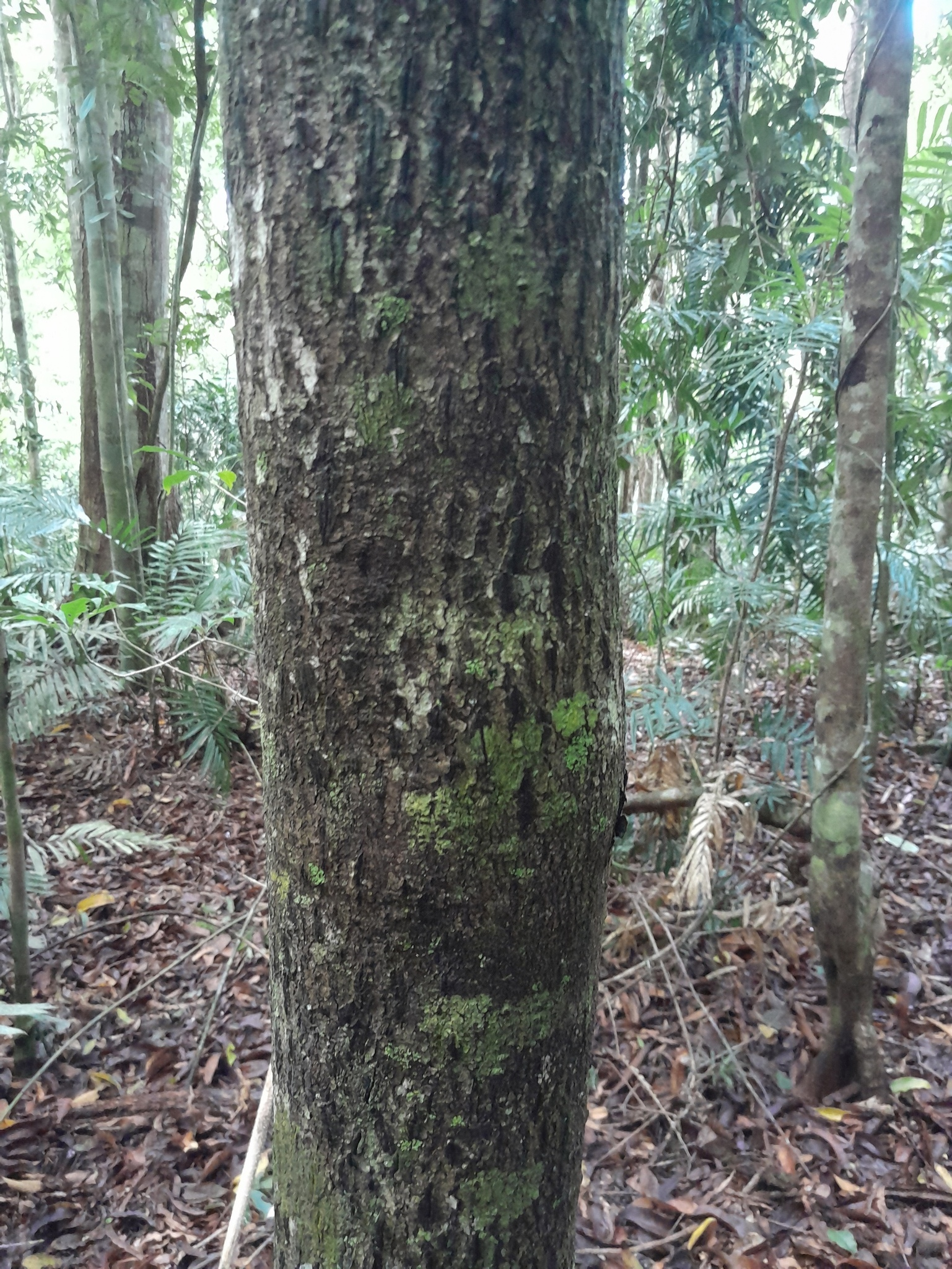
Trunk
