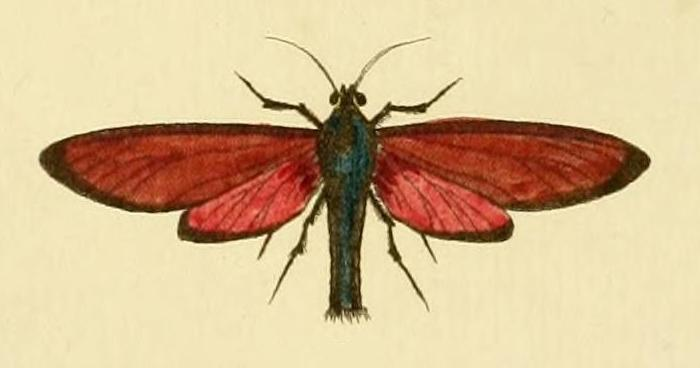
- Empyreuma pugione

Scientific classification
- Kingdom: Animalia
- Phylum: Arthropoda
- Clade: Pancrustacea
- Class: Insecta
- Order: Lepidoptera
- Superfamily: Noctuoidea
- Family: Erebidae
- Subfamily: Arctiinae
- Subtribe: Euchromiina
- Genus: Empyreuma; Hübner, 1818

Synonyms
- Chrysaor Hübner, 1808

= Empyreuma =

Genus of moths

Empyreuma is a genus of tiger moths in the family Erebidae, containing three closely related species. The name is derived from the Greek word ἐμπύρευμα, meaning "a live coal covered with ashes". Nerium oleander is currently the only known host plant for this genus, but Caribbean species from a New World Apocynaceae genus are the most likely original hosts, potentially Thevetia, Plumeria, Mandevilla, or Tabernaemontana.

== Species ==
- Empyreuma anassa Forbes, 1917
- Empyreuma heros Bates, 1934
- Empyreuma pugione (Linnaeus, 1767) – spotted oleander caterpillar moth
