= Empyreuma heros =

Scientific classification
- Kingdom: Animalia
- Phylum: Arthropoda
- Class: Insecta
- Order: Lepidoptera
- Superfamily: Noctuoidea
- Family: Erebidae
- Subfamily: Arctiinae
- Genus: Empyreuma
- Species: E. heros

Binomial name
- Empyreuma heros Bates, 1934

Species of moth

Empyreuma heros is a moth of the subfamily Arctiinae. It was described by Marston Bates in 1934. It is found on the Bahamas. E. heros is visually indistinguishable from E. pugione; identification requires DNA analysis.
