= C32H48O9 =

The molecular formula C_{32}H_{48}O_{9} (molar mass: 576.72 g/mol, exact mass: 576.3298 u) may refer to:

- Cerberin, a cardiac glycoside
- Oleandrin, a cardiac glycoside
