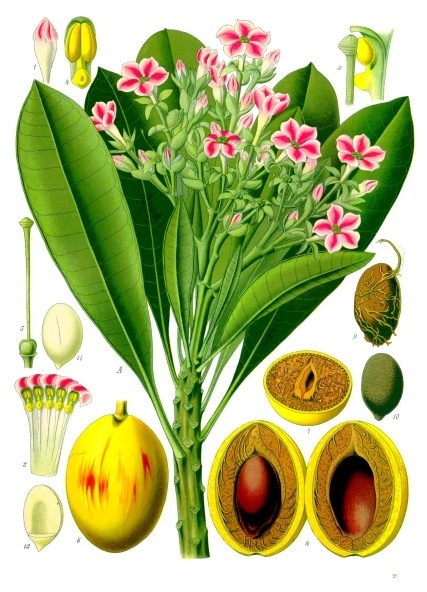
- Cerbera manghas

Scientific classification
- Kingdom: Plantae
- Clade: Tracheophytes
- Clade: Angiosperms
- Clade: Eudicots
- Clade: Asterids
- Order: Gentianales
- Family: Apocynaceae
- Subfamily: Rauvolfioideae
- Tribe: Plumerieae
- Subtribe: Thevetiinae
- Genus: Cerbera; L., 1753

Type species
- Cerbera manghas L., 1753

Synonyms
- Elcana Blanco; Odollam Adans.; Odollamia Raf.; Tanghinia Thouars; Thevetia Adans.

= Cerbera =

Genus of plants

Cerbera is a genus of evergreen trees or shrubs, native to tropical Asia, Australia, Madagascar, and various islands in the Indian and Pacific Oceans.

Three trees of this genus are mangroves, Cerbera floribunda, Cerbera manghas and Cerbera odollam.

== Description ==
They are perennial trees or shrubs growing up 30 m (98 ft) high, the branches with conspicuous leaf scars. The leaves are spirally arranged and crowded towards the ends of the branches. Each has up to 30 lateral veins that may be straight or upcurved, at 50 to 90 degrees to the midrib. All parts produce a white sticky latex.

The inflorescences are terminal with long peduncles, flowers are carried on short pedicels. Sepals are mostly free and usually pale green, the corolla is white, with a red, pink, yellow or white centre. Flowers are 5–merous and actinomorphic, i.e. they are symmetric and can be divided in equal halves along any diameter.

The fruit are ellipsoid drupes containing one or two seeds, and may be green, red, purple or blue.

== Taxonomy ==
Cerbera was first described by Carl Linnaeus in 1753 in his work Species Plantarum, in which he described three species — C. manghas, C. thevetia and C. ahouai. Of these, only C. manghas is still included in Cerbera (the other two having been moved to other genera) and is considered to be the lectotype.

The genus is most closely related to Cerberiopsis Vieil., Thevetia L. and Cascabela Raf..

=== Etymology ===
The genus is named after Cerberus, a three-headed dog in Greek mythology, because all the species are poisonous — they contain cerberin, a cardiac glycoside, a substance that blocks electric impulses in the body (including the beating of the heart). Therefore, it is advised to avoid using wood from Cerbera species due to their toxicity, and as their smoke may cause lethal poisoning.

== Species ==
The following is a list of all six species in this genus that are accepted by Plants of the World Online as of 6 September 2023

- Cerbera dumicola P.I.Forst. - Queensland
- Cerbera floribunda K.Schum. - Sulawesi, Maluku, Caroline Islands, New Guinea, Bismarck Archipelago, Solomon Islands, Queensland
- Cerbera inflata S.T.Blake - Queensland
- Cerbera laeta Leeuwenb. - New Guinea
- Cerbera manghas L. - Tanzania, Madagascar, the Indian subcontinent, mainland Southeast Asia, Malesia, Papuasia, northern Australia and numerous Pacific islands
- Cerbera odollam Gaertn. - Indian subcontinent, mainland Southeast Asia, Malesia, Papuasia and numerous Pacific islands

=== Formerly included here ===
- Cerbera obovata Roem. & Schult., now Craspidospermum verticillatum Bojer ex Decne.
- Cerbera oppositifolia Lam., now Ochrosia oppositifolia (Lam.) K.Schum.
- Cerbera thevetia L., now Cascabela thevetia (L.) Lippold
- Cerbera ahouai L., now Thevetia ahouai (L.) Vahl

== Gallery ==
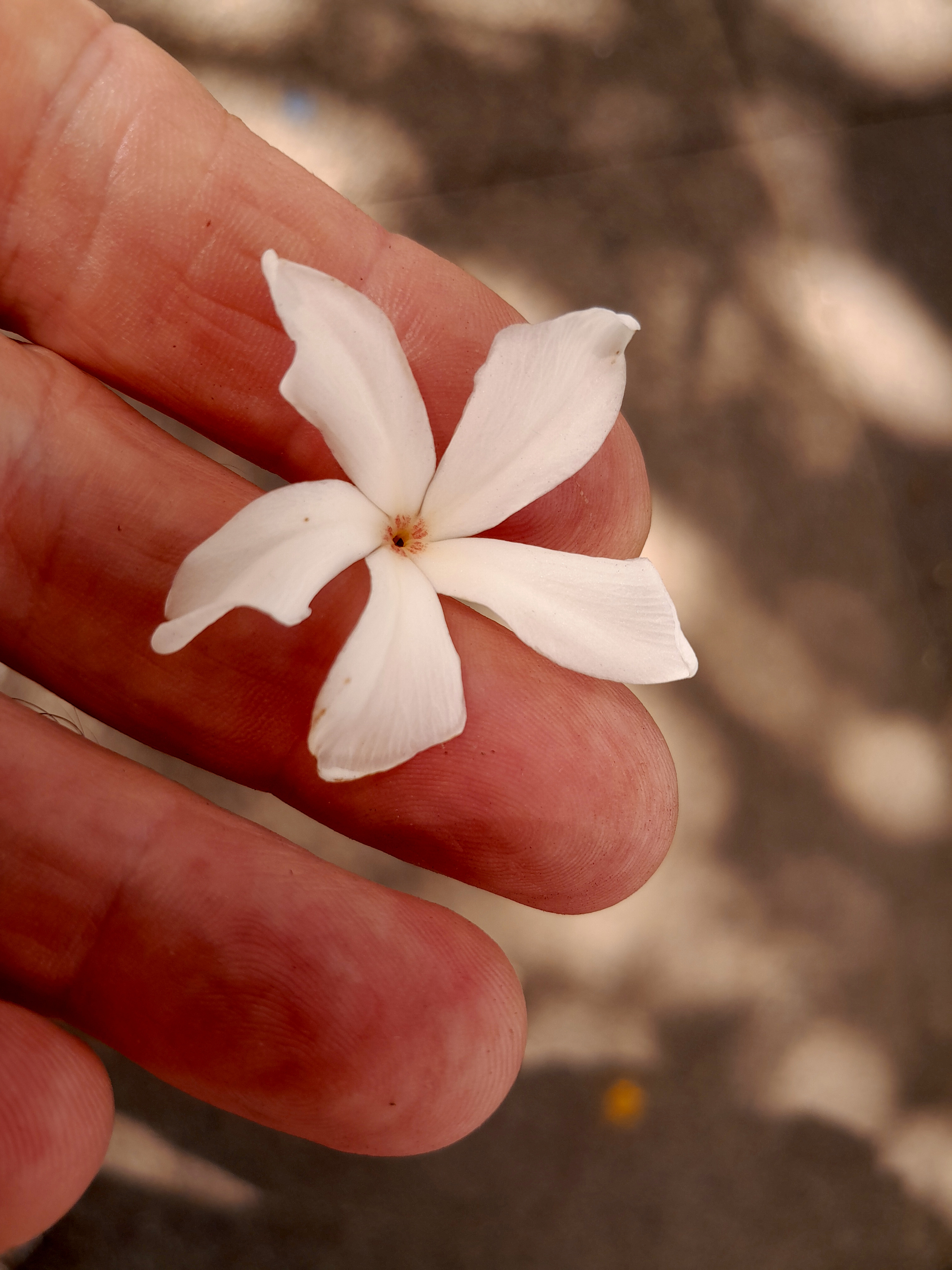
C. floribunda flower

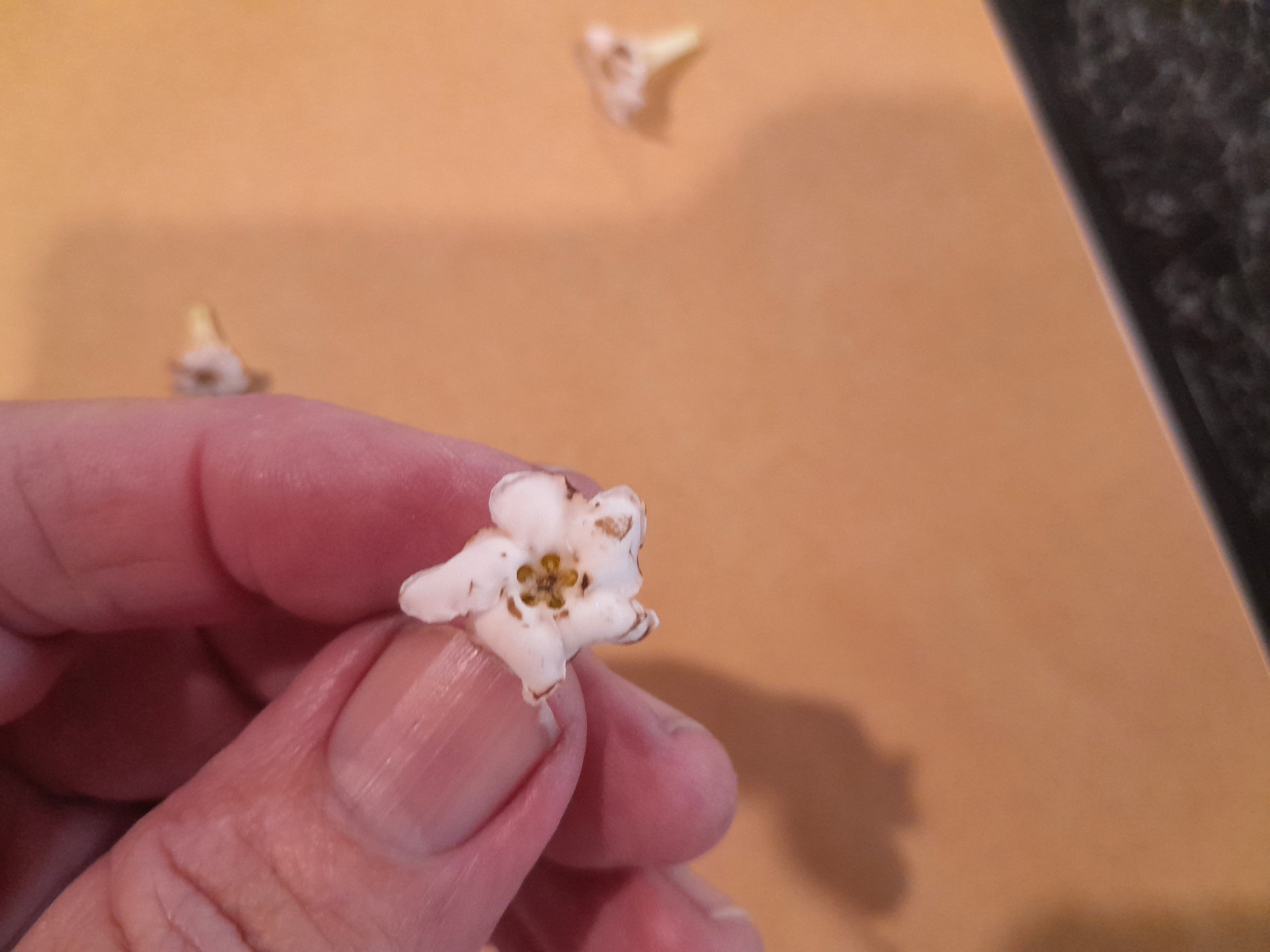
C. inflata flower

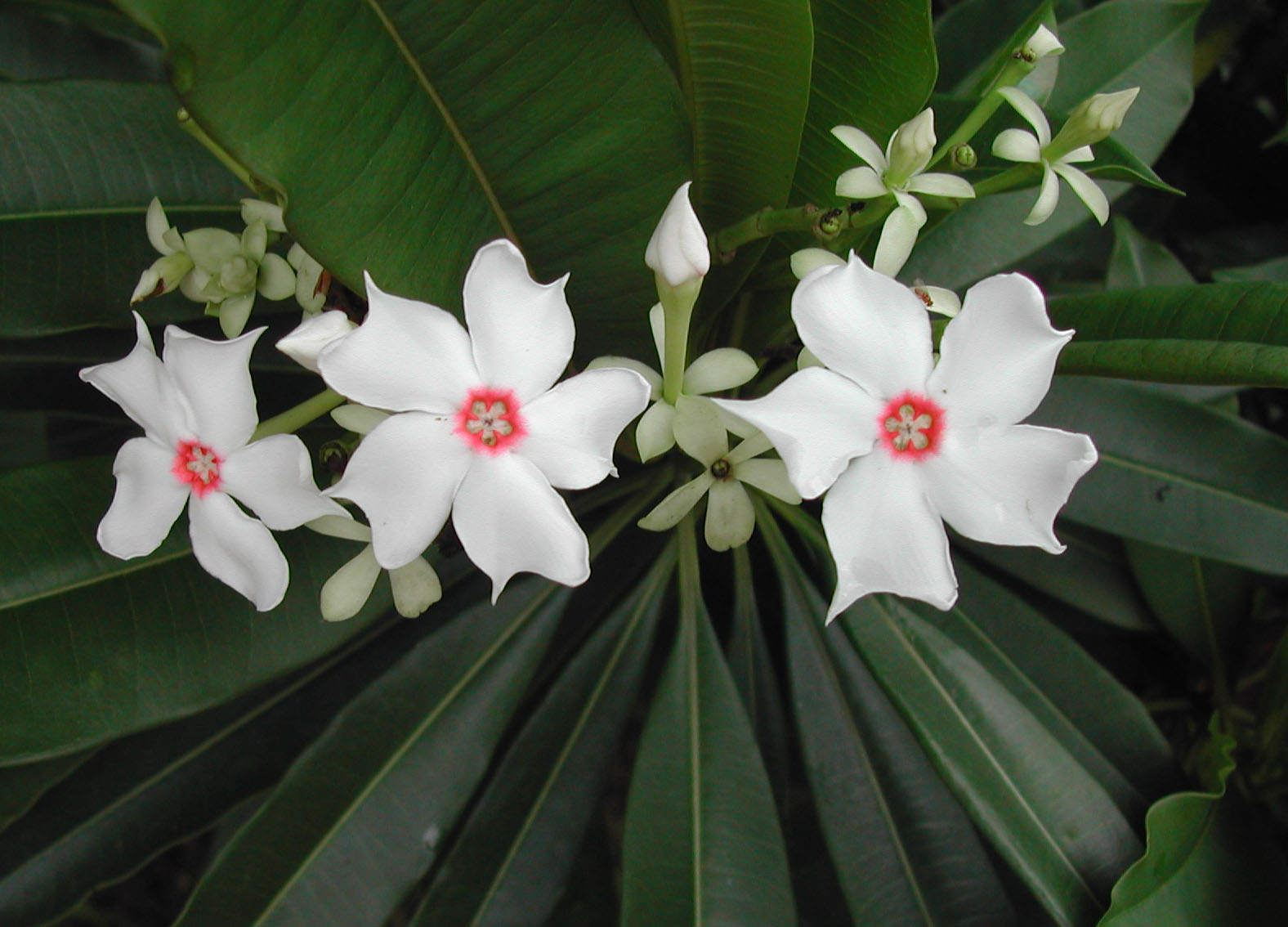
C. manghas flowers

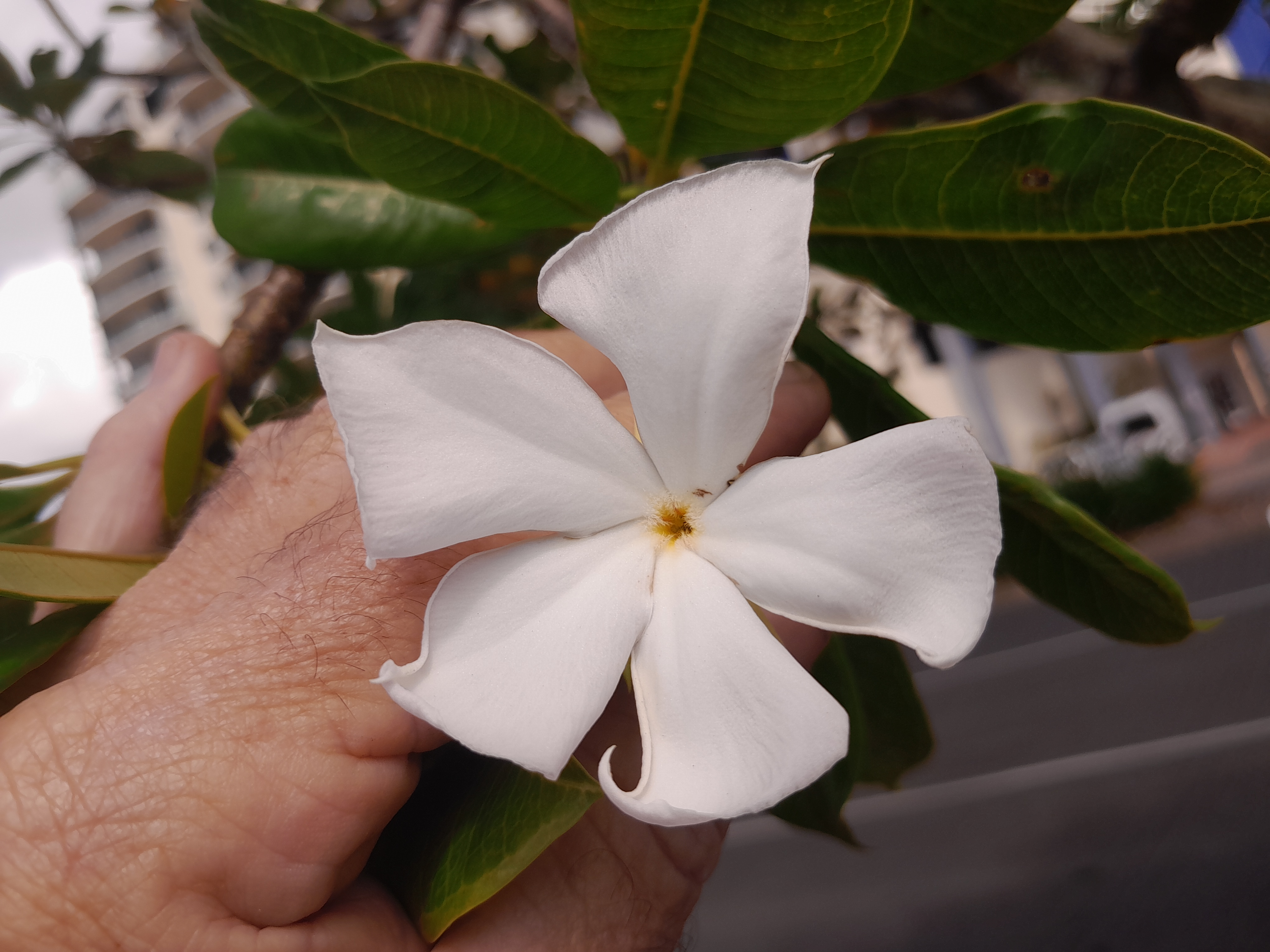
C. odollam flower
