= Empyreuma anassa =

Scientific classification
- Kingdom: Animalia
- Phylum: Arthropoda
- Clade: Pancrustacea
- Class: Insecta
- Order: Lepidoptera
- Superfamily: Noctuoidea
- Family: Erebidae
- Subfamily: Arctiinae
- Genus: Empyreuma
- Species: E. anassa

Binomial name
- Empyreuma anassa Forbes, 1917

Species of moth

Empyreuma anassa is a moth of the subfamily Arctiinae. It was described by William Trowbridge Merrifield Forbes in 1917. It is endemic to Jamaica.

== See also ==
- Anassa, a Greek word meaning "queen"
