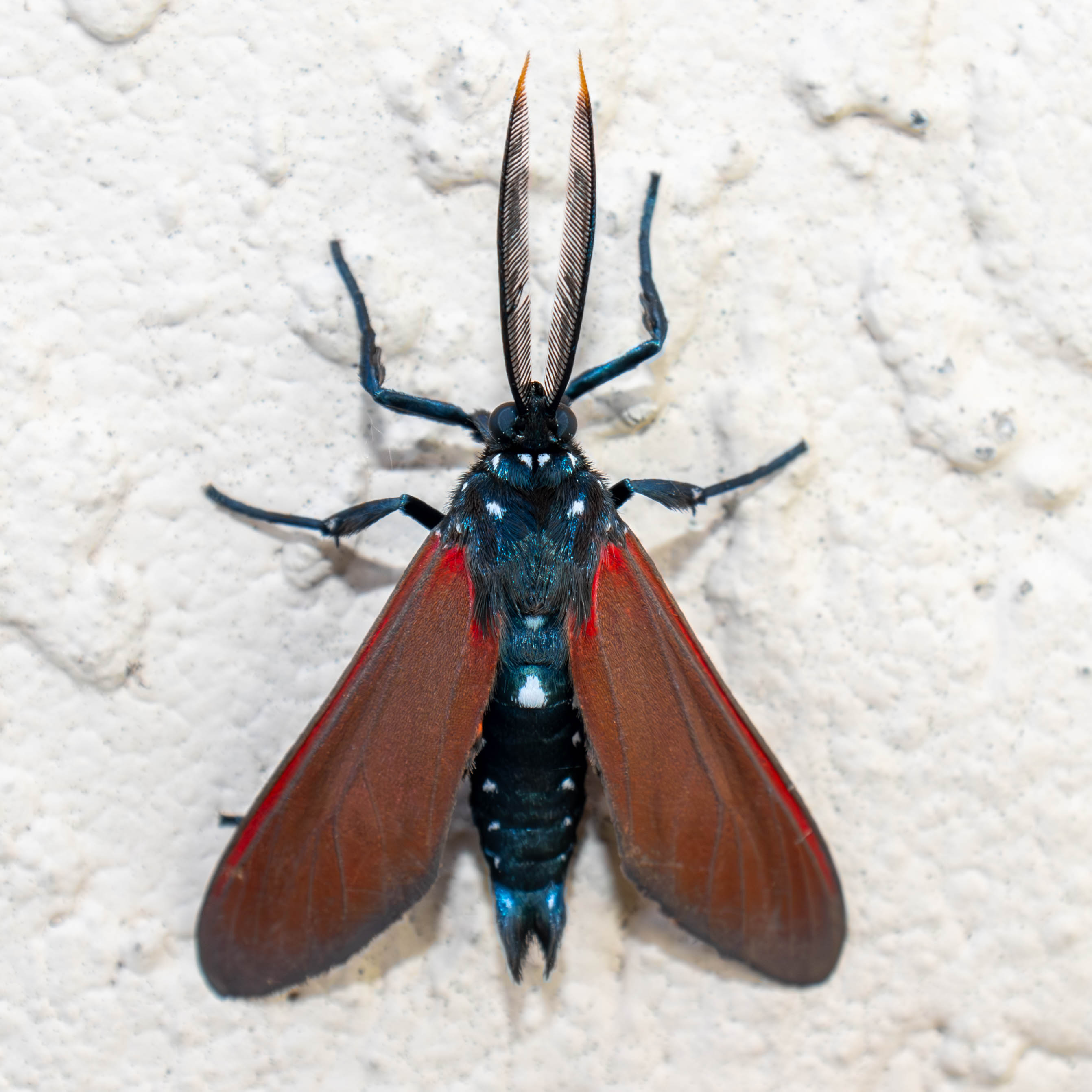

Scientific classification
- Kingdom: Animalia
- Phylum: Arthropoda
- Class: Insecta
- Order: Lepidoptera
- Superfamily: Noctuoidea
- Family: Erebidae
- Subfamily: Arctiinae
- Genus: Empyreuma
- Species: E. pugione

Binomial name
- Empyreuma pugione (Linnaeus, 1767)

Synonyms
- Sphinx pugione Linnaeus, 1767; Sphinx lichas Cramer, [1775]; Sphinx sanguinosa Martyn, 1797; Chrysaor erythropterus Hübner, 1808; Empyreuma mucro Zerny, 1912; Empyreuma sanguinea Rothschild, 1912; Empyreuma sanguinea portoricensis Rothschild, 1912; Empyreuma affinis Rothschild, 1912; Empyreuma affinis haitensis Rothschild, 1912

= Empyreuma pugione =

Species of moth

Empyreuma pugione, the spotted oleander caterpillar moth, is a moth of the subfamily Arctiinae. It is found in the West Indies, where it has been collected at elevations up to 733m, and has been introduced to the US state of Florida.

The wingspan is 43–48 mm. They fly during the day.

The larvae feed on Nerium oleander, but are likely to have fed on a Caribbean species from a New World Apocynaceae genus such as Thevetia, Plumeria, Mandevilla, or Tabernaemontana prior to the introduction of oleander. They are light orange and hairy.
