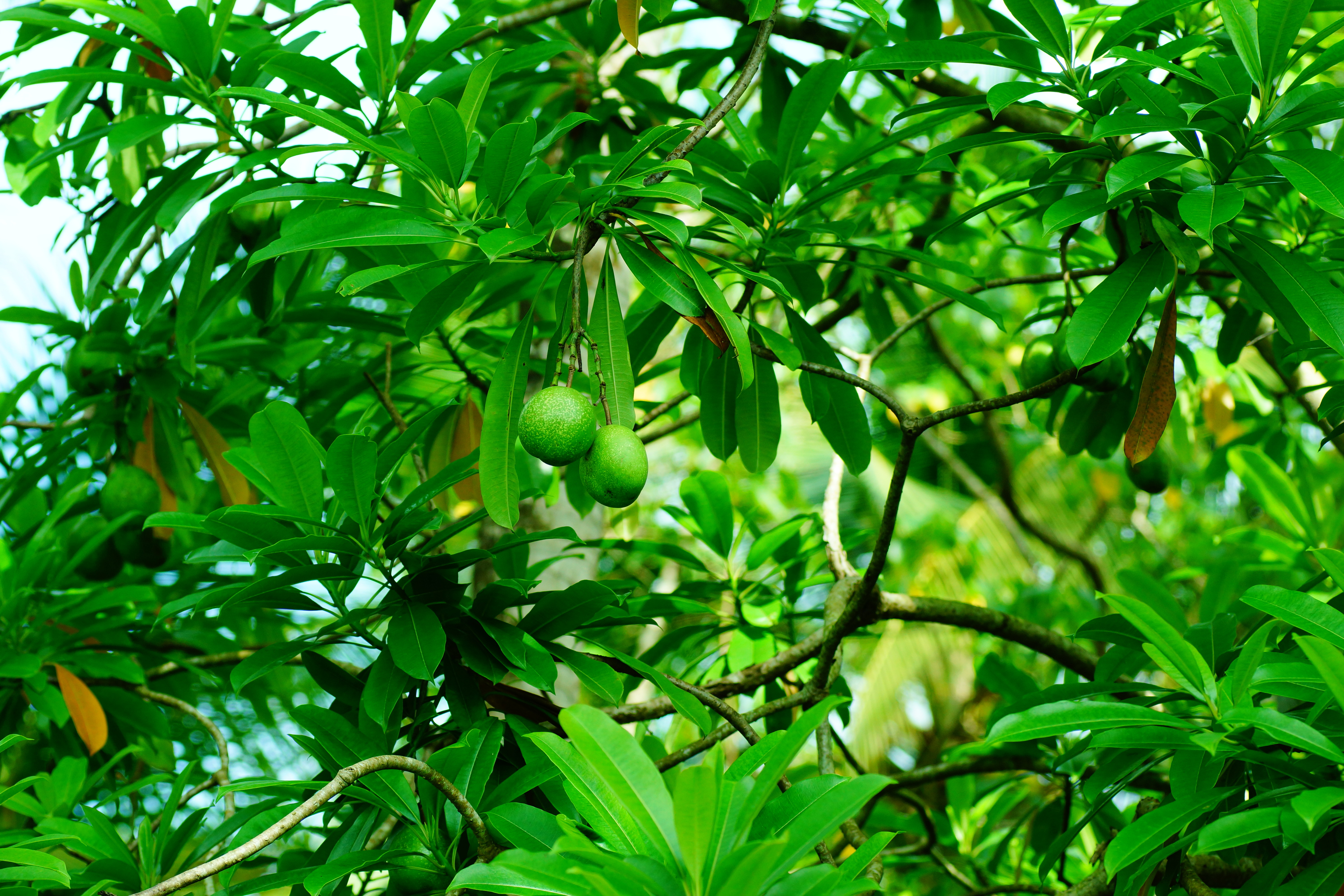
- Cerbera odollam, or the "pong-pong" tree

Conservation status
- Least Concern (IUCN 3.1)

Scientific classification
- Kingdom: Plantae
- Clade: Embryophytes
- Clade: Tracheophytes
- Clade: Angiosperms
- Clade: Eudicots
- Clade: Asterids
- Order: Gentianales
- Family: Apocynaceae
- Genus: Cerbera
- Species: C. odollam

Binomial name
- Cerbera odollam Gaertn.

Synonyms
- Cerbera dilatata Markgr.

= Cerbera odollam =

Species of tree

Cerbera odollam is a tree species in the family Apocynaceae commonly known as the suicide tree or pong-pong. It bears a fruit known as othalanga whose seeds yield a potent poison called cerberin. It has historically been used in trials by ordeal, especially in Madagascar, where it has caused thousands of deaths annually, and continues to be used for suicide, particularly in Kerala, India. It can cause fatal heart arrhythmias with just one kernel and is responsible for numerous poisonings due to its easily masked taste and limited testing.

It is native to South and Southeast Asia, Pacific Islands, and Queensland, Australia, growing preferentially along sandy coasts, riverbanks, and by mangrove swamps. It is also grown in tropical areas such as Hawaii as an ornamental. It is a 10–12 meter tall plant with glossy leaves, white-yellow flowers, and poisonous seeds encased in a red-ripening fruit that resembles oleander and produces a milky latex. Its seeds are used as biopesticides, insect repellents, and rat poisons due to their toxicity and have also been studied as a non-edible, sustainable feedstock for biodiesel production on non-arable land.

== Description ==
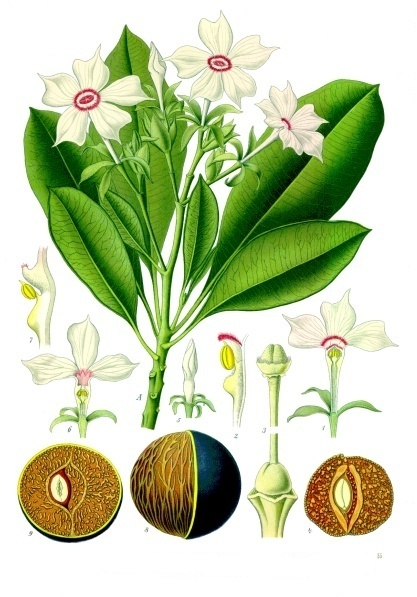
Diagram of different parts of the Cerbera odollam plant.

Cerbera odollam bears a close resemblance to oleander, another highly toxic plant from the same family. It grows to approximately 10–12 meters in height. Its leaves are glossy and it has white flowers with yellow throats. The plant as a whole yields a milky, white latex.

Its fruit, about 5–10cm in length, starts green and becomes red as it matures. It has a green fibrous shell enclosing an ovoid kernel measuring approximately 2 cm × 1.5 cm and containing two extremely poisonous seeds. On exposure to air, the white kernel turns violet, then dark grey, and ultimately brown, or black.

== History ==
=== Common names ===
Cerbera odollam is known by a number of vernacular names, depending on the region. These include othalam (ഒതളം) in the Malayalam language used in Kerala, India; kattu arali (காட்டரளி) in the adjacent state of Tamil Nadu; dabur (ডাবুর) in Bengali; famentana, kisopo, samanta or tangena in Madagascar; and pong-pong, buta-buta, bintaro or nyan in Southeast Asia.

=== Use in trials by ordeal ===
The poisonous kernel of the Cerbera odollam fruit was used in trials by ordeal like the tangena throughout the regions where it grew. In Madagascar in the 18th and 19th centuries, over 3,000 people died per year from consuming Cerbera odollam seeds in a trial by ordeal. These trials were intended to determine whether the subject was guilty of a crime, often witchcraft. In these trials, a dosage of the seed was administered. If the subject lived, they were considered innocent of whatever crime they were accused. If they died, they were considered guilty. These trials relied on the belief that some underlying spirit would distinguish between innocence and guilt.

Trials by ordeal using cerberin were extremely common. In the mid-1800s, leaders attempted to regulate trials by ordeal in Madagascar. For minor crimes, dogs or chickens were used as a substitute for humans. However, it wasn't until the early 1900s that this practice stopped.

=== Use for suicide ===
Cerbera odollam was also frequently used for suicide and continues to be used for this purpose in the modern day. For instance, a 2004 study found that it was responsible for about one suicide death per week between 1989 and 1999 in Kerala, India. To commit suicide, people would remove the kernels from the seed and combine it with jaggery to eat. Death would occur quickly, about 3-6 hours after ingestion.

== Toxicity ==
Cerberin, the poisonous compound in the kernels of Cerbera odollam, is a cardiac glycoside and, as such, blocks the heart's sodium and potassium ATPase. One kernel contains a fatal dose of the toxin.

=== Symptoms ===
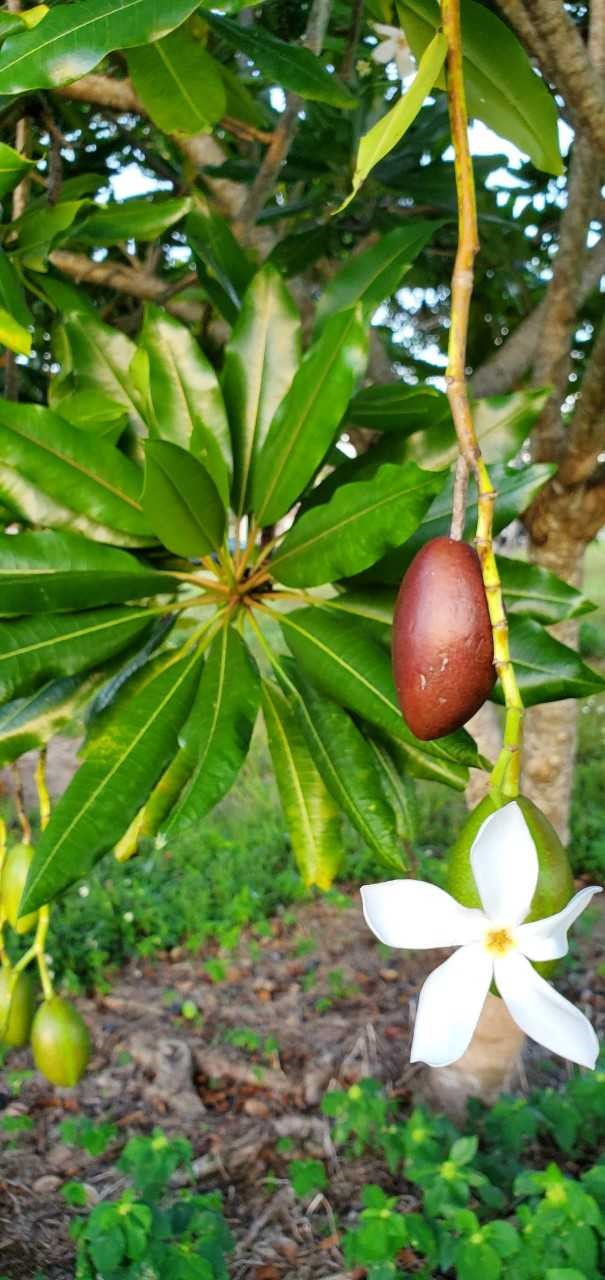
Cerbera odollam fruits, flower, and leaves, Dededo, Guam

Electrocardiographic abnormalities are common, the most common being sinus bradycardia. Around half of the patients develop thrombocytopenia. Temporary cardiac pacing has been used in the management, apart from other supportive measures.

Other common symptoms of cerberin poisoning include a burning sensation in the mouth, vomiting, retching, nausea, irregular breathing, headache, coma, and death. Some cases are asymptomatic.

=== Use as a poison ===
Cerbera odollam is commonly used for poisonings as well as suicides. Its bitter flavor can easily be masked by spicy food, allowing victims to ingest it without noticing. In Kerala, C. odollam is responsible for about 50% of plant poisoning cases and 10% of all poisonings.

The fatalities from poisonings, particularly from C. odollam, are underestimated due to the lack of testing in most cases. Poisonings outside the tree's natural range are considered rare.

== Modern uses ==
The seeds of C. odollam are used as biopesticides, insect repellants, and rat poisons due to its toxicity to these animals.

Investigations have also been made into the feasibility of using the seeds as a feedstock in the production of biodiesel. Oil can be extracted from the seeds and transesterified into fatty acid methyl esters. This is a good alternative to other plants commonly used for biodiesels because unlike these plants, it grows on typically non-arable land and therefore does not compete with food crops.

== Gallery ==
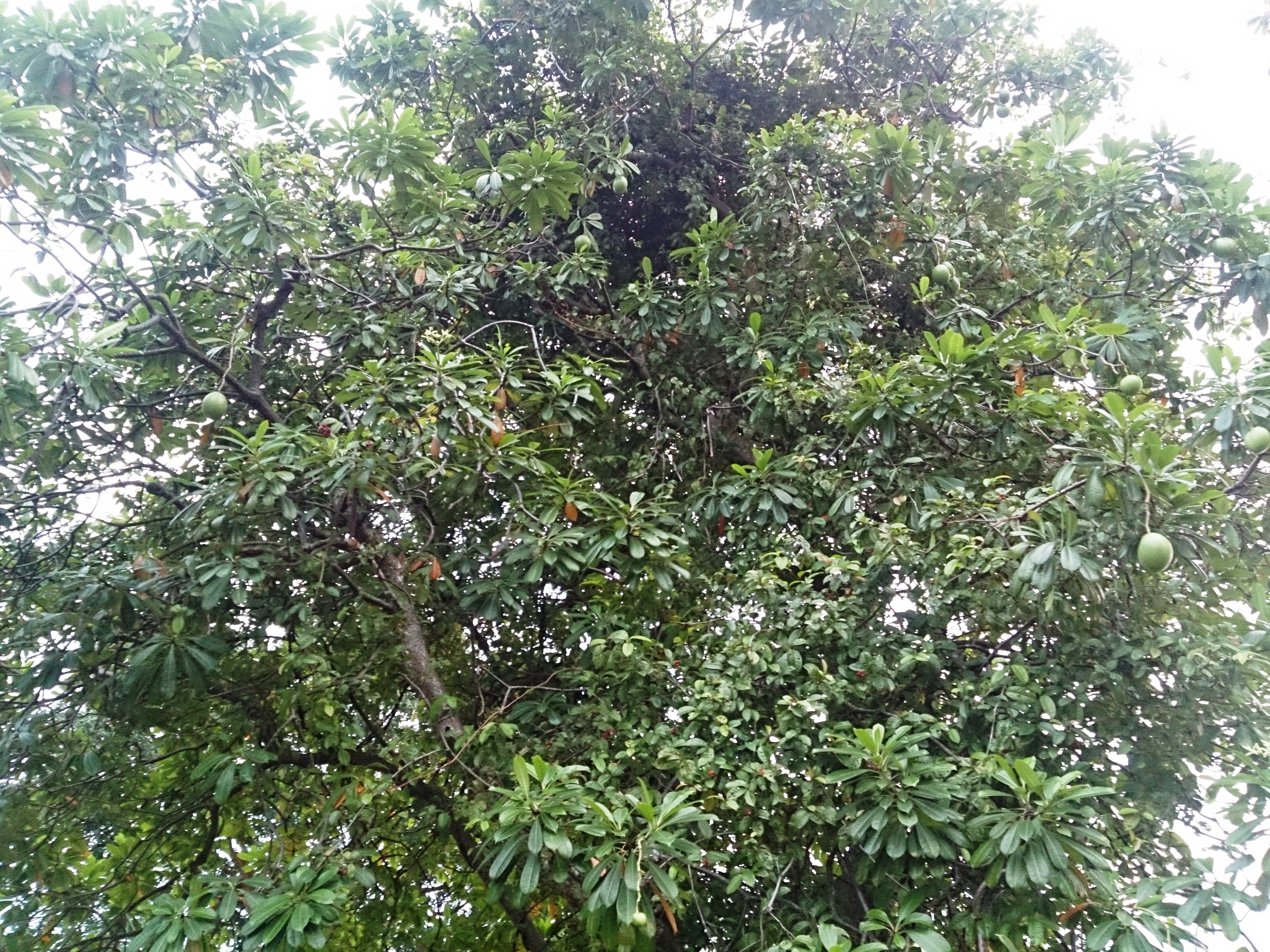
Mature tree

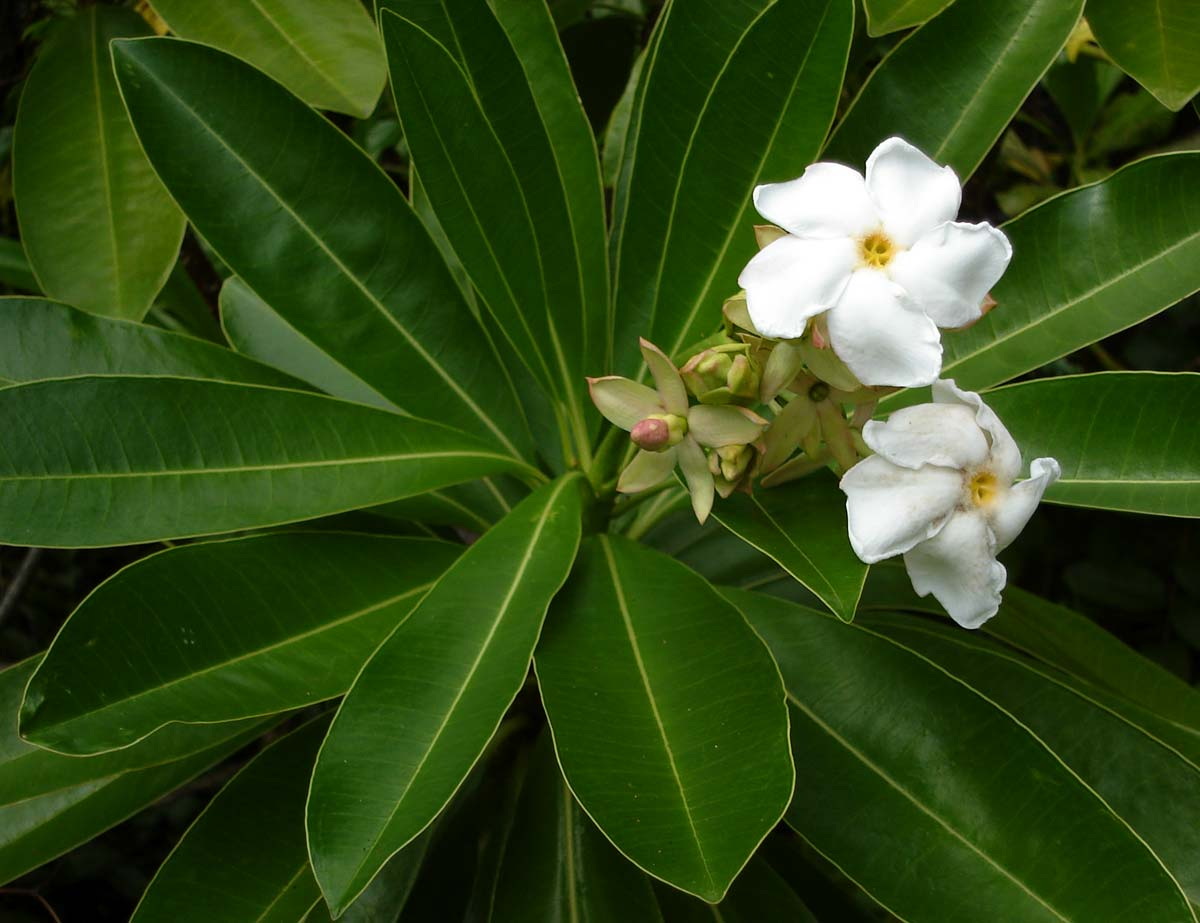
Flowers

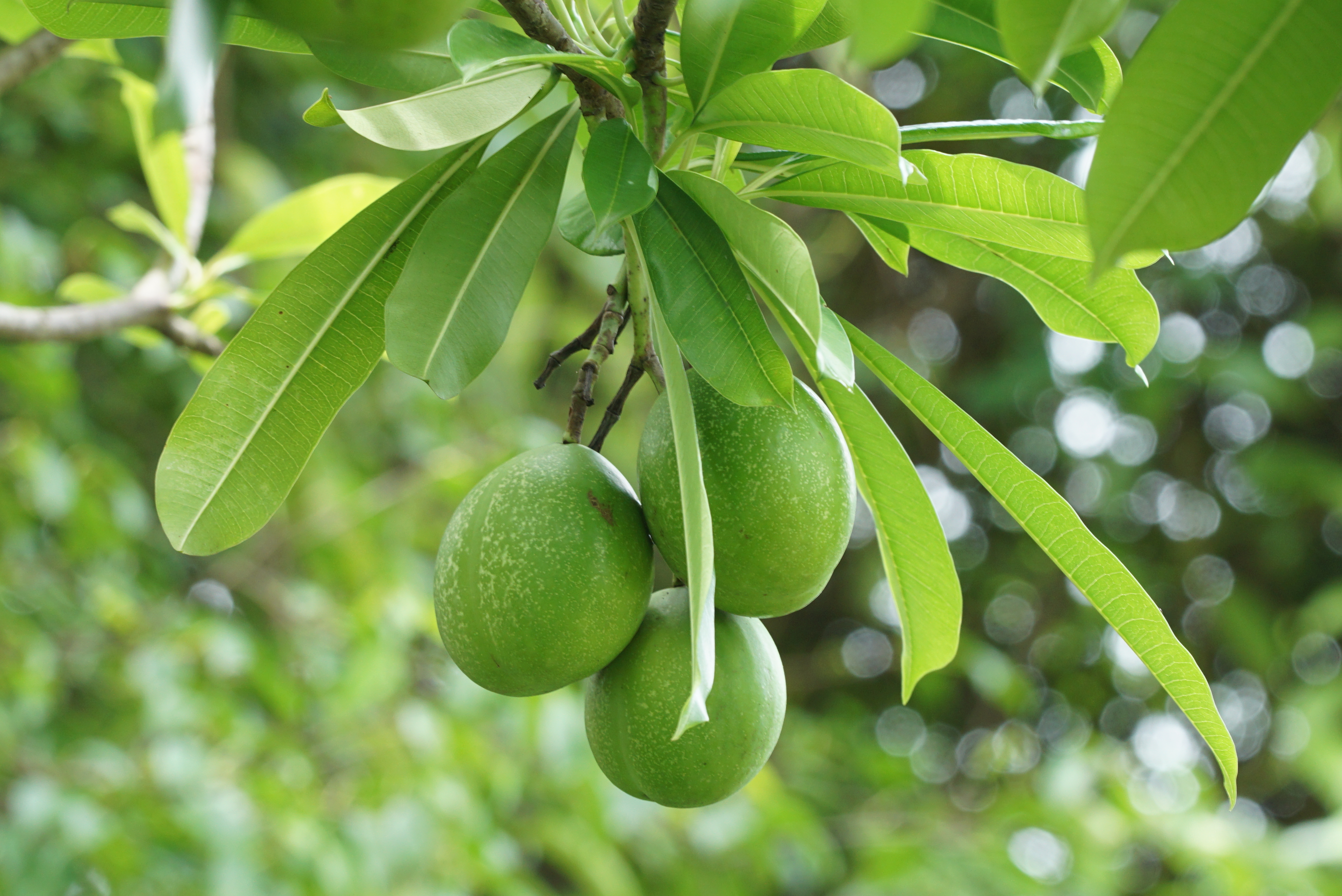
Developing fruits

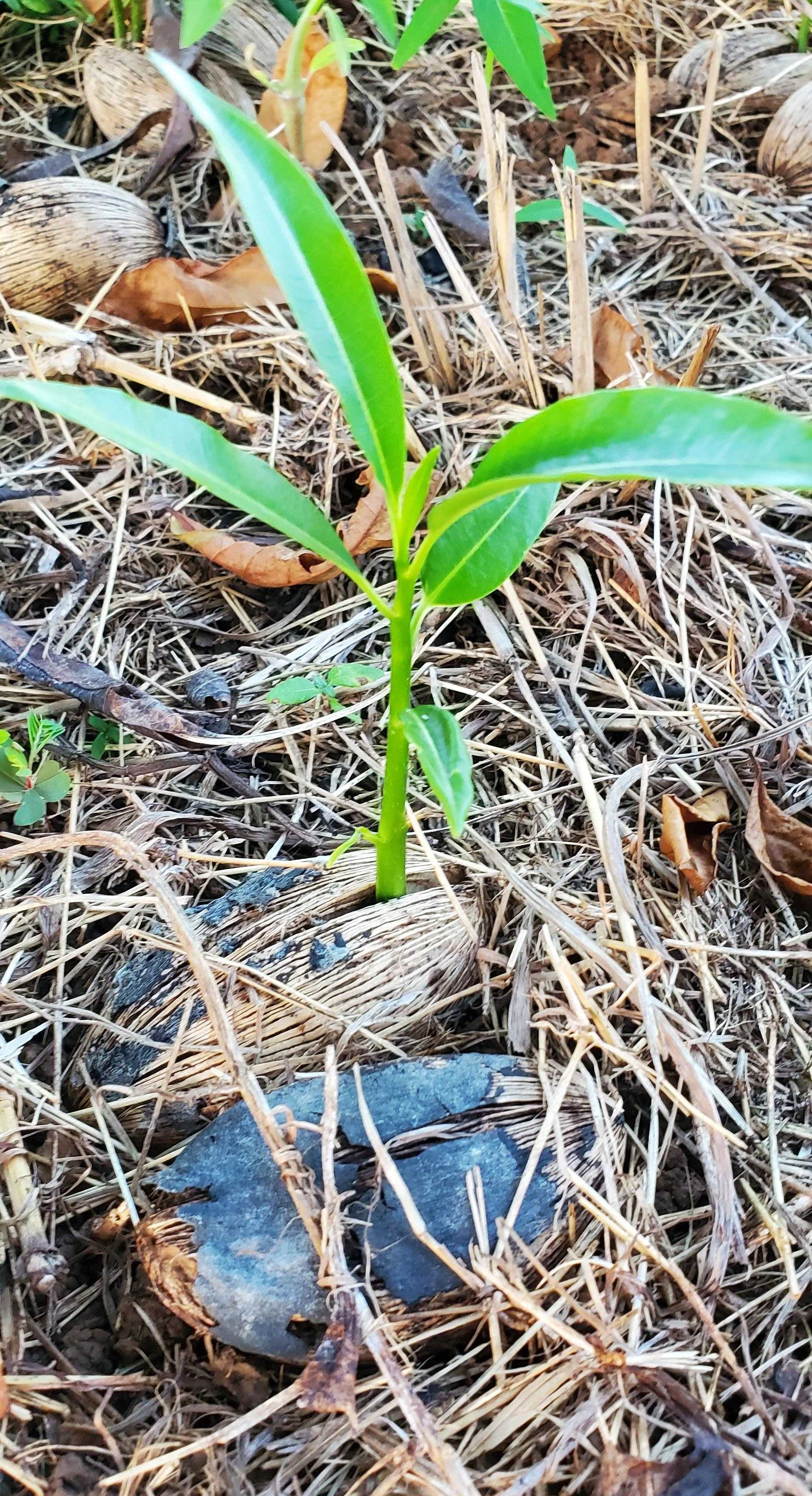
Fruits and seedling. Dededo, Guam

== See also ==
- List of poisonous plants
