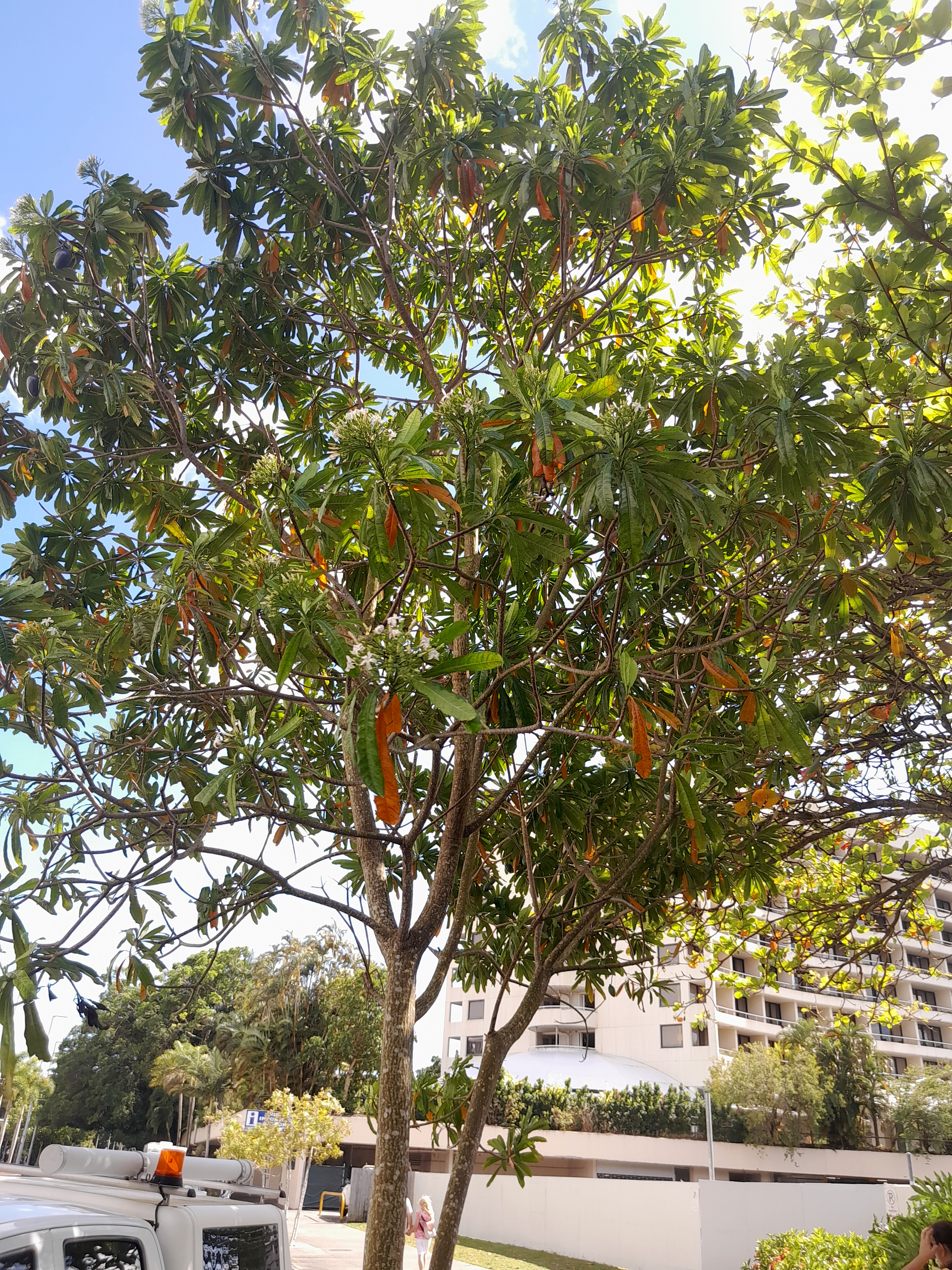
- Street tree in Cairns, Queensland

Conservation status
- Least Concern (IUCN 3.1)

Scientific classification
- Kingdom: Plantae
- Clade: Embryophytes
- Clade: Tracheophytes
- Clade: Spermatophytes
- Clade: Angiosperms
- Clade: Eudicots
- Clade: Asterids
- Order: Gentianales
- Family: Apocynaceae
- Genus: Cerbera
- Species: C. floribunda

Binomial name
- Cerbera floribunda K.Schum.

Synonyms
- Cerbera batjanica Teijsm. & Binn. ex Valeton; Cerbera micrantha Kaneh.

= Cerbera floribunda =

Cassowary plum

Species of tree in the family Apocynaceae

Cerbera floribunda, commonly known as cassowary plum, grey milkwood, or rubber tree, is a plant in the family Apocynaceae which is native to the region from Sulawesi to the Solomon Islands, including northeast Queensland, Australia.

== Description ==
Cerbera floribunda is a tree that grows up to 30 m (98 ft) in height. The bark is brown to grey/black, and the sap wood and heart wood are both white. Leaves are lanceolate-elliptic, glossy green above and paler beneath, alternate or whorled and crowded towards the ends of the twigs. They measure up to 30 cm (12 in) long by 5 cm (2 in) wide, with 13 to 20 curved lateral veins and are attached by a long petiole up to 40 mm (1.6 in) long.

The inflorescence is a much branched cyme up to 17 cm (6.7 in) with usually more than 50 flowers. The flowers have 5 white sepals, a corolla tube up to 12 mm (0.47 in) by 3 mm (0.12 in) wide with 5 free lobes at the end. They are white with a pink or red centre, are about 25 to 30 mm (1.0 to 1.2 in) in diameter, and have a sweet scent.

Fruits are a bright blue/purple drupe measuring about 10 cm (4 in) long by 5 cm (2 in) wide, slightly pointed and the end away from the pedicel (stem), with a single large seed.

== Taxonomy ==
Cerbera floribunda was first described by Karl Moritz Schumann in Die Flora von Kaiser Wilhelms Land (K.M.Schumann & U.M.Hollrung, Fl. Kais. Wilh. Land: 111 (1889)) in 1889.

== Distribution and habitat ==
This is a tropical plant and favours abundant water. The native range is from Sulawesi, east through the Maluku Islands and New Guinea to Solomon Islands, and south to Queensland; it is widespread throughout the range and not considered to be endangered. It is generally found along creeks and marshes and always near permanent water. Altitudinal range in Australia is from sea level to 500 m (1,600 ft).

== Ecology ==
Fruits are swallowed whole by southern cassowaries, who are not affected by the toxins contained within. They then excrete the seeds later, helping to distribute them. The cassowary is the only animal able to provide this function, due to the size of the fruits, and this forms a classic example of a symbiotic relationship between the two species.

Rodents, in particular the giant white-tailed rat, eat the kernels after stripping away the flesh but in this case (if they leave some of the kernel behind) it is unlikely to germinate.

== Toxicity ==
As with other species of Cerbera, and indeed many other species in the family Apocynaceae, fruits of this plant are toxic to humans. Cerbera species contain the cardiac glycoside cerberin, and if eaten will result in nausea, vomiting, abdominal pain, and potentially death. The white sap, which is produced from all parts of the tree, may also cause skin irritation on contact.

== Uses ==
The timber has been used for mouldings and interior finishings in Bouganville and other parts of Papua New Guinea, and for carvings and medicine in the Solomon Islands.

== Gallery ==
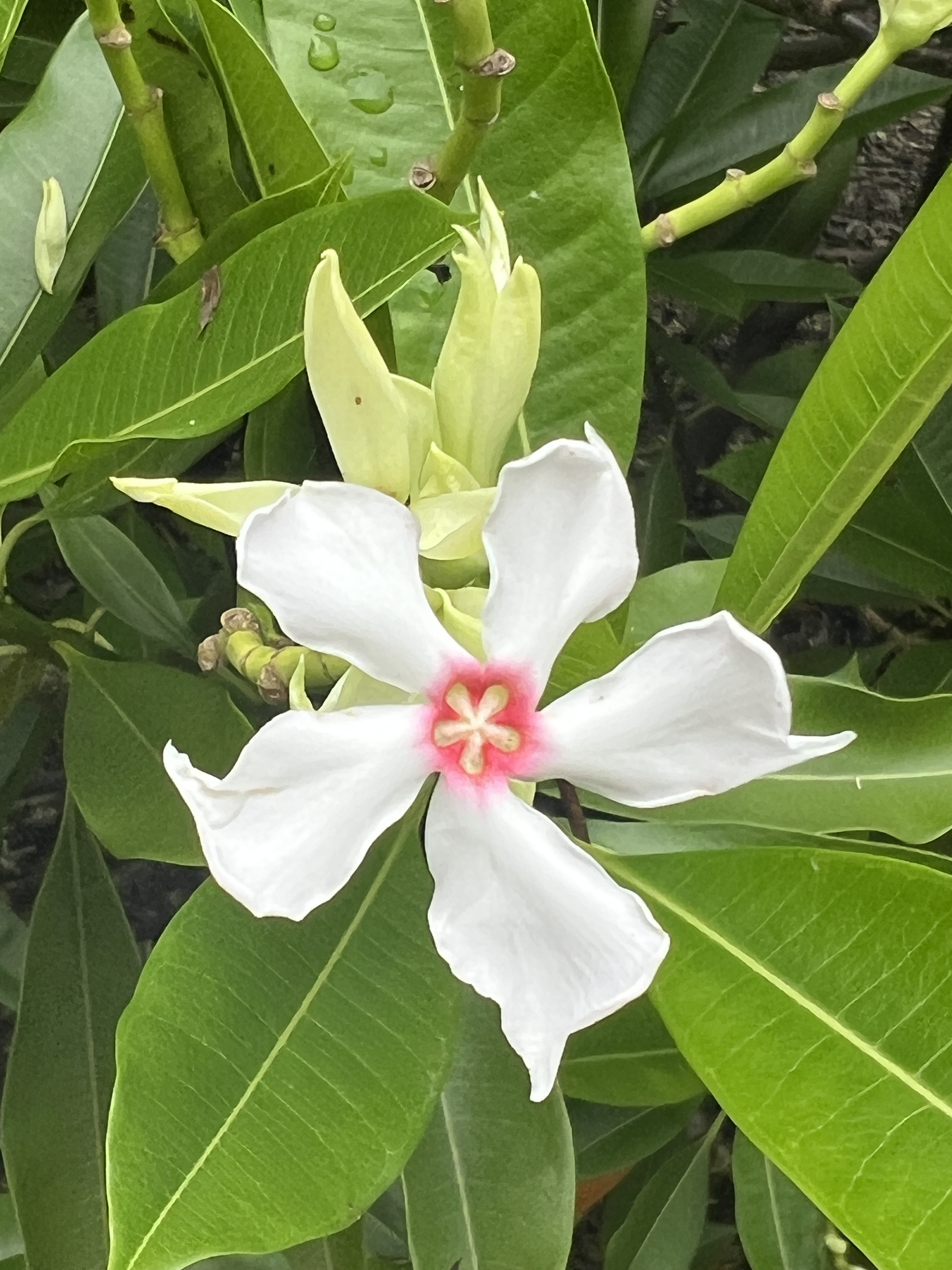
Flower

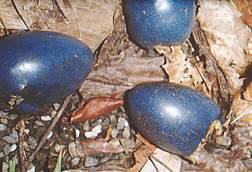
Fruit

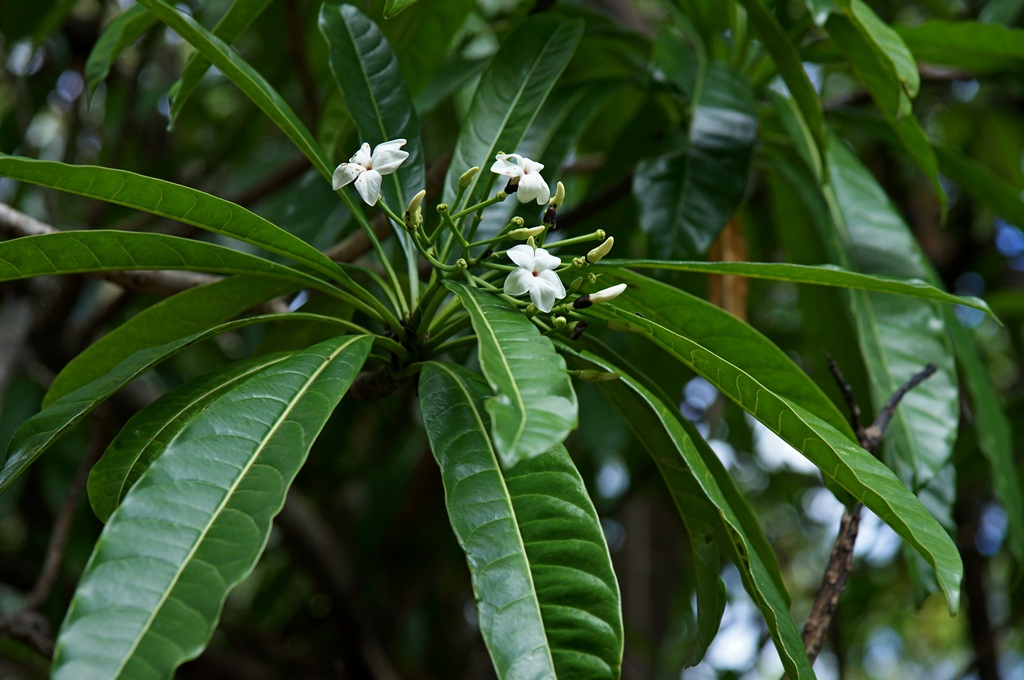
Foliage and flowers
