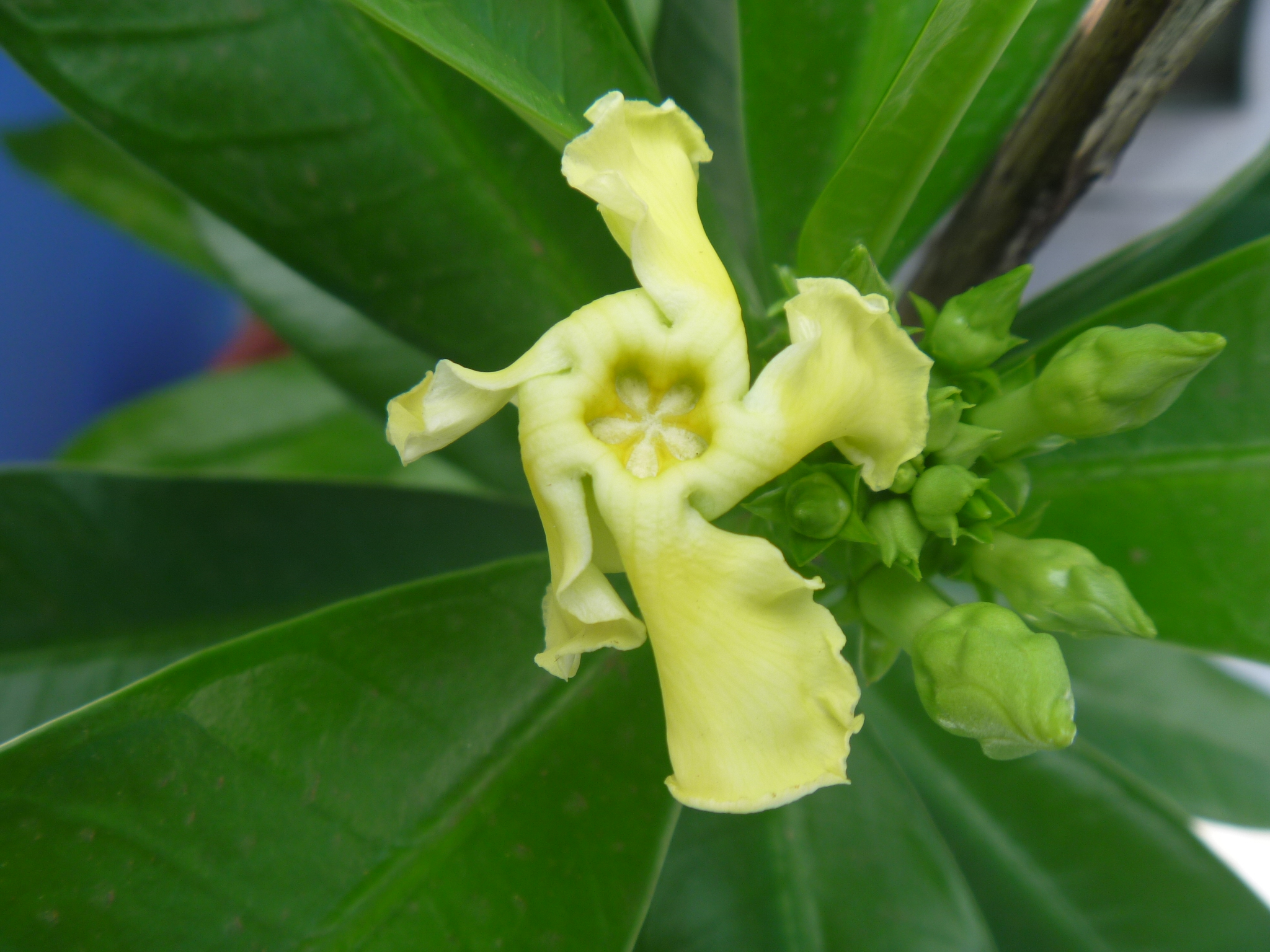
- Flower
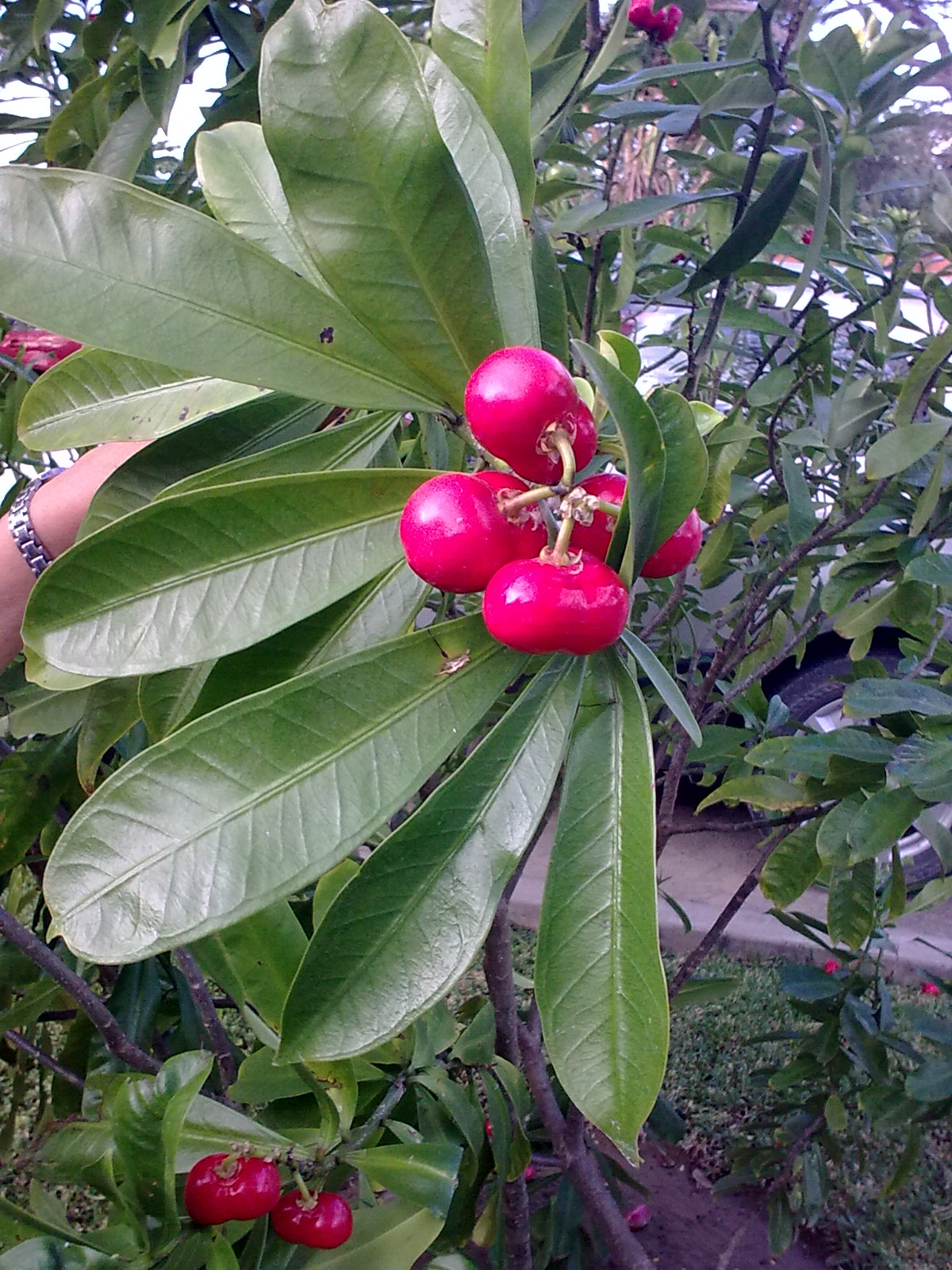
- Fruit are poisonous

Conservation status
- Least Concern (IUCN 3.1)

Scientific classification
- Kingdom: Plantae
- Clade: Tracheophytes
- Clade: Angiosperms
- Clade: Eudicots
- Clade: Asterids
- Order: Gentianales
- Family: Apocynaceae
- Genus: Thevetia
- Species: T. ahouai

Binomial name
- Thevetia ahouai (L.) Vahl

Synonyms
- List: Ahouai nitida (Kunth) Pichon; Cerbera ahouai L.; Cerbera nitida Kunth; Plumeriopsis ahouai (L.) Rusby & Woodson; Thevetia ahuai Raf.; Thevetia calophylla Miers; Thevetia nitida (Kunth) A.DC.

= Thevetia ahouai =

Species of plant

Thevetia ahouai is a species of flowering plant in the family Apocynaceae, native to Mexico, Central America, Cuba, Colombia, and Venezuela, and introduced to southeastern China. An evergreen shrub or small tree of forests reaching 3 m (10 ft), it is used as a street tree in Nicaragua and Colombia.
