= Cerberin =

Names
- IUPAC name 14-Hydroxy-5β-card-20(22)-enolid-3β-yl α-D-quinovopyranoside 2-acetate
- Systematic IUPAC name (2R,3S,4R,5S,6S)-5-Hydroxy-2-[(1R,3aS,3bR,5aR,7S,9aS,9bS,11aR)-3a-hydroxy-9a,11a-dimethyl-1-(5-oxo-2,5-dihydrofuran-3-yl)hexadecahydro-1H-cyclopenta[a]phenanthren-7-yl]-4-methoxy-6-methyloxan-3-yl acetate
- Other names 2′-Acetylneriifolin (3β,5β)-3-[(2-O-Acetyl-6-deoxy-3-O-methyl-α-L-glucopyranosyl)oxy]-14-hydroxycard-20(22)-enolide

Identifiers
CAS Number	25633-33-4
3D model (JSmol)	Interactive image
ChEBI	CHEBI:75049
ChemSpider	8206634
PubChem CID	10031063
UNII	KW5A155S64
CompTox Dashboard (EPA)	DTXSID30893922
- InChI: InChI=1S/C32H48O9/c1-17-26(35)27(37-5)28(40-18(2)33)29(39-17)41-21-8-11-30(3)20(15-21)6-7-24-23(30)9-12-31(4)22(10-13-32(24,31)36)19-14-25(34)38-16-19/h14,17,20-24,26-29,35-36H,6-13,15-16H2,1-5H3/t17-,20+,21-,22+,23-,24+,26-,27+,28-,29-,30-,31+,32-/m0/s1 Key: UYQMTWMXBKEHJQ-IVHDSYOHSA-N
- SMILES: C[C@H]1[C@@H]([C@H]([C@@H]([C@@H](O1)O[C@H]2CC[C@]3([C@@H](C2)CC[C@@H]4[C@@H]3CC[C@]5([C@@]4(CC[C@@H]5C6=CC(=O)OC6)O)C)C)OC(=O)C)OC)O

Properties
Chemical formula	C_{32}H_{48}O_{9}
Molar mass	576.727 g·mol^{−1}
Melting point	212 °C (414 °F)
- Except where otherwise noted, data are given for materials in their standard state (at 25 °C [77 °F], 100 kPa). Infobox references

Cerberin is a type of cardiac glycoside found in the seeds of trees in the genus Cerbera, including the suicide tree (Cerbera odollam) and the sea mango (Cerbera manghas). As a cardiac glycoside, cerberin disrupts the function of the heart by blocking its sodium and potassium ATPase. Cerberin can be used as a treatment for heart failure and arrhythmia.

Overconsumption of cerberin results in poisoning. Symptoms include nausea, vomiting, and bradycardia, often leading to death. Cerberin-containing plants such as Cerbera odollam have historically been used for suicide and homicide in their native regions due to their high toxicity.

== Structure and properties ==
=== Structure ===
Digitoxigenin, the cardenolide substructure of cerberin, with the tetracyclic array of all-carbon steroid rings at its core, to which is attached the butenolide-type, oxygen-containing lactone substituent.

Cerberin, like all cardiac glycosides, has as its core a steroid-type set of four carbocycles (all-carbon rings). In cerberin, this steroid core is connected, first, to a separate oxygen-containing lactone ring (shown here, upper right of box), and second, to a sugar substituent (shown in infobox structure, left of image).

There are two types of cardiac glycosides depending on the characteristics of the lactone moiety. Cerberin, with its five-membered ring, belongs to the cardenolide class; cardenolides are 23-carbon steroids with methyl groups at positions 10 and 13 of the steroid ring system, and the appended five-membered butenolide-type of lactone at C-17.

Many types of sugars can be attached to cardiac glycosides; in the case of cerberin, it is an O-acetylated derivative of α-L-thevetose, which is itself a derivative of L-glucose (6-deoxy-3-O-methyl-α-L-glucopyranose). The cardenolide substructure to which the sugar is attached has also been independently characterised, and can be referred to as digitoxigenin (see image), hence, cerberin is, synonymously, (L-2′-O-acetylthevetosyl)digitoxigenin. As well, the non-acetylated structure was independently discovered and named neriifolin, and so cerberin is, synonymously, 2′-acetylneriifolin.

=== Physical properties ===
Cerberin is slightly soluble in chloroform and methanol. It is white to pale yellow in color.

== Toxicity ==
The literature on cerberin toxicity, per se, remains sparse; unless otherwise specifically indicated, the following is general information regarding cardiac glycoside toxicity, with an emphasis on information from cardenolides (i.e., steroid natural products bearing the same digitoxigenin substructure).

A historic, reported lethal dose of cerberin in dogs is 1.8 mg/kg, and in cats 3.1 mg/kg; that is, it is very low. However, toxicity in humans is variable. One study showed that with treatment, humans could survive dosages of 1/2 kernel 94% of the time, 1 kernel 92% of the time, 2 kernels 71% of the time, and 4 kernels 67% of the time. Deaths were also variable when cerberin was used for trials by ordeal.

=== Symptoms ===
Those who ingest cerberin experience, within an hour, a variety of gastrointestinal and cardiac symptoms, particularly nausea, vomiting, abdominal pain, and bradycardia. Forensic sources indicate presentations for cardiac toxin poisonings that additionally include burning sensations in the mouth, diarrhea, headache, dilated pupils, irregular beating of the heart, and drowsiness; coma and death most often eventually follow. There is no clear, reported correlation between the dose and mortality (see above); death often occurs after 3–6 hours.

=== Poisonings ===
There is significant evidence from Cerbera with regard to lethal poisonings. Individual cases of poisoning from Cerbera are documented including direct and indirect, and intentional and unintentional ingestion. Cases of human fatalities from consumption of crab where the crustacean had earlier consumed plants producing cerberin or related cardenolides are known.

Aside from accidental poisoning, cerberin has also been used for suicide and homicide. For example, a 2004 study found that Cerbera odollam was responsible for an average of one suicide death per week between 1989 and 1999 in Kerala, India. It was also the cause of 50% of plant poisoning cases and 10% of all poisonings in that region.

Cerberin is ideal for use as a poison because it is fast acting, its flavor is easy to mask when added to food, and it is relatively undetectable because there is only one analytical test to determine its presence in tissues after death.

== Mechanism of action ==
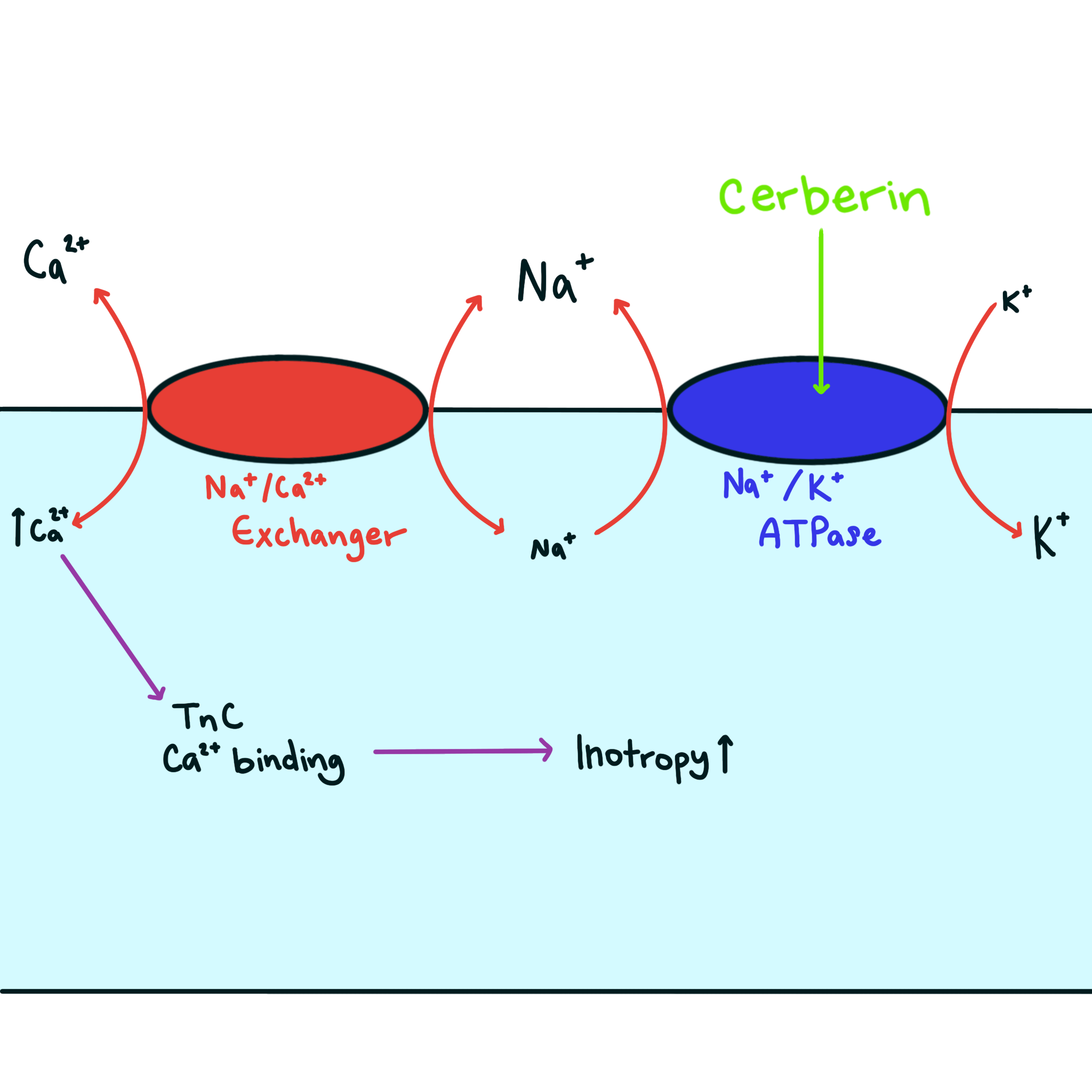
The mechanism of action of cerberin from current understanding, based on the MOA of general cardiac glycosides.

There is very little formal, modern published information on the mechanism of action of cerberin.

Cerberin, as a cardiac glycoside, is seen as binding to and inhibiting the cellular Na^{+}/K^{+} -ATPase, because it binds to the alpha-subunit of the enzyme. This is the catalytic moiety. There are also a beta- and FXYD subunits. These two subunits influence the affinity of cerberin to Na^{+}/K^{+} -ATPase. The expression of the beta- and FXYD-subunit is tissue-specific. Because of this, cerberin will have different effects in different tissues. When cerberin binds to the Na^{+}/K^{+}-ATPase the conformation of the enzyme changes. This will lead to the activation of signal transduction pathways in the cell. A detailed description of the effects of cerberin in the cell is given below.

=== Na^{+}/K^{+}-ATPase pump ===
Na^{+}/K^{+}-ATPase is an ion transport system of sodium and potassium ions and requires energy. It is often used in many types of cellular systems. Sodium ions move out of the cell and potassium ions enter the cell (3:2) with the aid of this pump. During the transport of these ions, the enzyme undergoes several changes in conformation. Including a phosphorylation and dephosphorylation step.

The transport of Na^{+} and K^{+} is important for cell survival. Cardiac glycosides, such as cerberin, alter the transport of ions against their gradient. Cerberin is able to bind to the extracellular part of the Na^{+}/K^{+}-ATPase pump and can block the dephosphorylation step. Due to this inhibition it is impossible to transport sodium and potassium across the membrane and results in raising intracellular concentration of Na^{+}.

=== Na^{+}/Ca^{2+}-exchanger ===
Accumulation of intracellular sodium ions cause an increase of intracellular calcium. This is because the calcium-sodium exchange pump’s activity decreases. The calcium-sodium exchange pump exchanges Ca^{2+} and Na^{+} without the use of energy. This exchanger is essential for maintaining sodium and calcium homeostasis. The exact mechanism by which this exchanger works is unclear. It is known that calcium and sodium can move in either direction across the membrane of muscle cells. It is also known that three sodium ions are exchanged for each calcium and that an increase in intracellular sodium concentration through this exchange mechanism leads to an increase in intracellular calcium concentration. As intracellular sodium increases, the concentration gradient driving sodium into the cell across the exchanger is reduced. As a result, the activity of the exchanger is reduced, which decreases the movement of calcium out of the cell.

Thus by inhibiting the Na^{+}/K^{+}-ATPase, cardiac glycosides cause intracellular sodium concentration to increase. This leads to an accumulation of intracellular calcium via the Na^{+}/Ca^{2+}-exchange system with the following effects:

- In the heart, increased intracellular calcium causes more calcium to be released, thereby making more calcium available to bind to troponin-C, which increases contractility (inotropy).
- Inhibition of the Na^{+}/K^{+}-ATPase in vascular smooth muscle causes depolarization, which causes smooth muscle contraction.

The conformational change of Na^{+}/K^{+}-ATPase plays not only a role in the contraction of muscles, but also in cell growth, cell motility and apoptosis. Due to de binding of cerberin, specific second messengers can be activated. After a cascade of cellular interactions nuclear transcription factors binds to the DNA and new enzymes will be made. This enzymes can for example play a role in cell proliferation.^{[subscription required]}

=== Metabolism ===
Very little is known about the metabolism of cerberin. For the related digoxin, another cardiac glycoside, it is in largest part excreted unchanged by the kidneys (60-80%), with the remaining mostly metabolised by the liver. The half-life for digoxin is 36–48 hours for people with a normal renal function and up to 6 days for people with a compromised renal function. This makes the renal function an important factor in the toxicity of digoxin and perhaps for cerberin as well.

== Efficacy ==
There is very little formal, modern published information on the pharmacological actions of cerberin. One primary source reports that its ingestion results in electrocardiogram (ECG) changes, such as various types of bradycardia (e.g., sinus bradycardia), AV dissociation, and junctional rhythms; second-degree sinoatrial block and nodal rhythm are also described.

In the case of digitalis administration, ST depression or T wave inversion may occur without indicating toxicity; however, PR interval prolongation indicate toxicity.

== Therapeutic uses ==
There are no clearly established therapeutic uses of the title compound, cerberin. Digitalis compounds, related cardiac glycosides, function through the inhibition of the Na+/K+-ATPase-pump, and have been widely used for in the treatment of chronic heart failure and arrhythmias; although newer and more efficacious treatments for heart failure have mostly replaced digitalis, as of 2022, digitalis compounds remain in limited use, mostly for arrythmias. Some cardiac glycosides have been shown to have antiproliferative and apoptotic effects, and are therefore of interest as potential agents in cancer chemotherapy; there is a single report to date of possible antiproliferative activity of cerberin.
