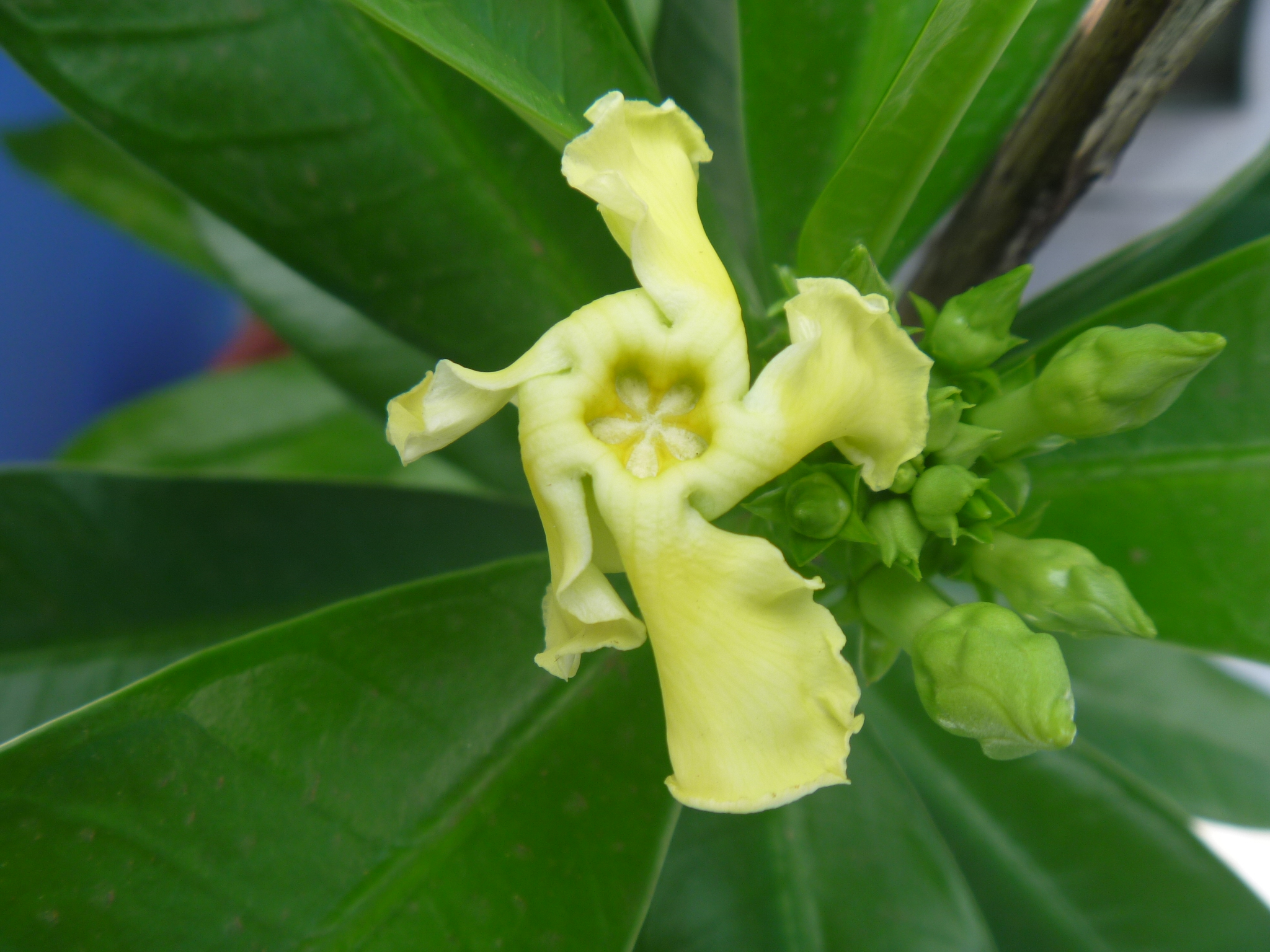
- Thevetia ahouai

Scientific classification
- Kingdom: Plantae
- Clade: Tracheophytes
- Clade: Angiosperms
- Clade: Eudicots
- Clade: Asterids
- Order: Gentianales
- Family: Apocynaceae
- Subfamily: Rauvolfioideae
- Tribe: Plumerieae
- Subtribe: Thevetiinae
- Genus: Thevetia; L.

Synonyms
- Ahouai Mill.; Plumeriopsis Rusby & Woodson

= Thevetia =

Genus of flowering plants

Thevetia is a genus of flowering plants in the family Apocynaceae, first described for modern science as a genus in 1758. It is native to Mexico, Central America, South America, and Cuba. The taxonomy of the genus is controversial, with some authors including Cascabela within Thevetia, while others accept the two genera as separate.

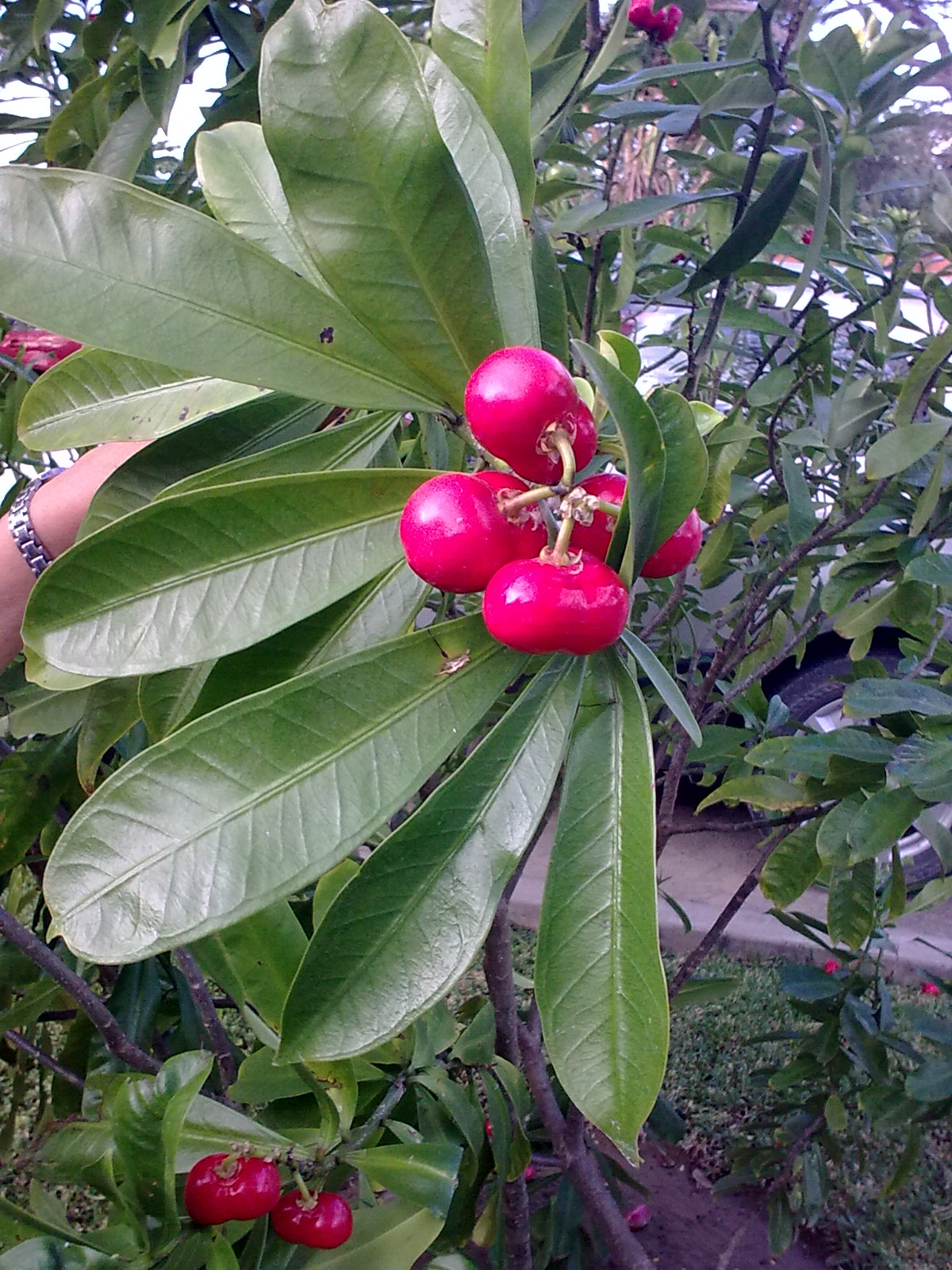
Fruit and leaf detail of Thevetia ahouai

Species

1. Thevetia ahouai (L.) A.DC. - Mexico, Central America, Cuba, Venezuela, Colombia
2. Thevetia amazonica Ducke - Brazil, Bolivia
3. Thevetia bicornuta Müll.Arg. - Brazil, Paraguay, NE Argentina

formerly included

1. Thevetia alliodora = Cascabela ovata
2. Thevetia cuneifolia = Cascabela ovata
3. Thevetia gaumeri = Cascabela gaumeri
4. Thevetia humboldtii (Kunth) Voigt 1845 not R.H. Schomb. 1840 = Cascabela thevetioides
5. Thevetia linearis = Cascabela thevetia
6. Thevetia neriifolia = Cascabela thevetia
7. Thevetia ovata = Cascabela ovata
8. Thevetia peruviana = Cascabela thevetia
9. Thevetia pinifolia = Cascabela pinifolia
10. Thevetia plumeriifolia = Cascabela ovata
11. Thevetia spathulata = Cascabela gaumeri
12. Thevetia steerei = Cascabela gaumeri
13. Thevetia thevetia = Cascabela thevetia
14. Thevetia thevetioides = Cascabela thevetioides
15. Thevetia yccotli = Cascabela thevetioides
