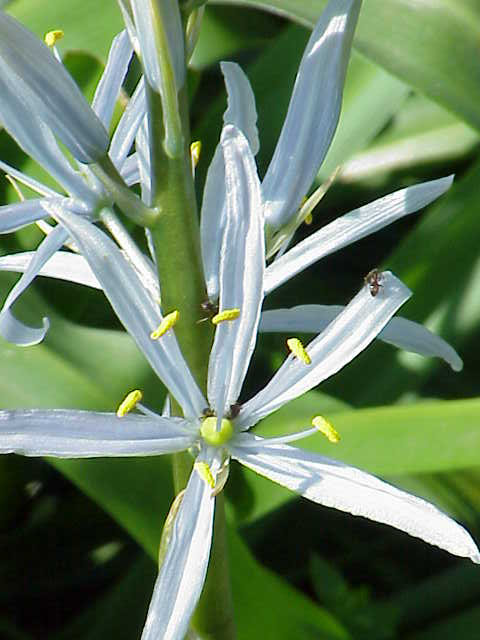
- C. cusickii

Conservation status
- Apparently Secure (NatureServe)

Scientific classification
- Kingdom: Plantae
- Clade: Tracheophytes
- Clade: Angiosperms
- Clade: Monocots
- Order: Asparagales
- Family: Asparagaceae
- Subfamily: Agavoideae
- Genus: Camassia
- Species: C. cusickii

Binomial name
- Camassia cusickii S.Watson

= Camassia cusickii =

Cusick's camas

Species of flowering plant

Camassia cusickii, common name Cusick's camas or Cusick's quamash, is a species of plant in the family Asparagaceae (subfamily Agavoideae). It is native to parts of North America. C. cusickii originally appeared in horticultural journals in the late 1800s.

== Description ==
Camassia cusickii has linear leaves with parallel venation and flowers in parts of three. The flowers are usually ice blue or baby blue, although they can be various shades of blue, cream, and white. The flowers are slightly zygomorphic with the tepals withering separately after anthesis. C. cusickii has yellow anthers and a fruiting pedicel incurving-erect or slightly spreading. The capsules are not deciduous, they are light brown in color, and have an ovoid or ellipsoid shape. The flowers in the wild have a deeper, darker hue compared to their garden forms tending to be a lighter blue color.

== Distribution ==
Although scattered from coast to coast, Camassia cusickii is more abundant in the northwestern states, specifically Oregon and Idaho. It is commonly found in the Canadian Life Zone and prefers damp meadows. Stations have been located in the Eagle Creek Mountains, Powder River Mountains, and Blue Mountains of northeastern Oregon. C. cusickii is a federal 3c Bureau of Land Management Sensitive Species and 'Idaho Native Plant Society Sensitive Species'. This species spreads over Eastern Oregon in a variety of the local climates, from Mount Hebo on the North Coast, to the isolated area of the Hell's Canyon overlook.

== Habitat and ecology ==
A native to North America, Camassia cusickii tolerates damp meadows at subalpine and alpine elevations (4,000–6,000 feet (1,220–1,830 m)) and tolerates pond edges, rich soils, and bloom well in either sun or shade. C. cusickii generally blooms in May. Cusick's camas self-seed and germinate easily, as long as they find rich, moist, and well-drained soil.

== Morphology ==
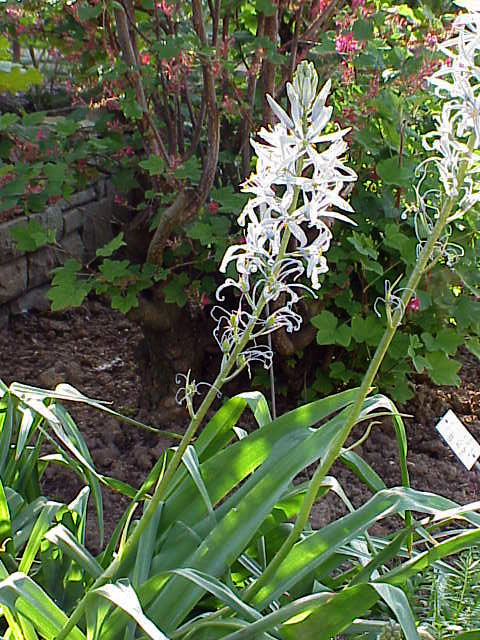
Camassia cusickii

C. cusickii grows from a bulb and has long basal leaves with parallel venation. The flowers are in parts of threes and the petals, which are usually of a pale blue, are long and slim. The flowers appear as a raceme on top of a long (up to 30 inches (760 mm)) stem. There can be 100 flowers in a raceme. The bulb formed by C. cusickii has a bulb two or three times the size of the bulb in other species of this genus. However, despite the bulb size it is not the tallest of the species (the tallest being Camassia leichtlinii). The evolutionary path and species' variability within the genus Camassia have not been thoroughly studied, partly due to the fact that they have likely been influenced by "hybridization and geographic isolation" in North America. It is thought that C. cusickii could be a recent mutant from C. quamash.

== Food ==
This plant was not used as a food source for Native Americans. The large root of this relative of Camassia is pungent, slimy, and bitter tasting. This bitter taste is due to steroidal saponins within the plant. These saponins found in the bulbs of C. cusickii are being isolated and used in multiple studies helping to provide a point of reference for further studies on plant saponins. C. cusickii is commonly confused with its near sister relative the C. quamash, which Native Americans would harvest the roots to consume as raw vegetables, or they boiled them to create a "sweet, molasses-like treat."

== Cultivation ==
C. cusickii prefers fertile moist soil, but well drained humus rich soil that does not become over saturated with water. The bulbs are usually planted 6 inches (150 mm) deep in late summer or early fall, but later planting can also be successful. In very cold areas, the soil should be mulched to protect the bulbs in late autumn. Camassias can be propagated by removing the offsets that have formed round the main bulbs and replanting them individually; do this in summer when they are dormant. Sweet William and Peonies offer as good companions to C. cusickii. They can be planted in flower beds, borders, rock gardens, and also be planted as cut flowers. This plant thrives among perennials. C. cusickii can naturalize and serve as ground cover. C. cusickii is generally resistant to deer and rodents.

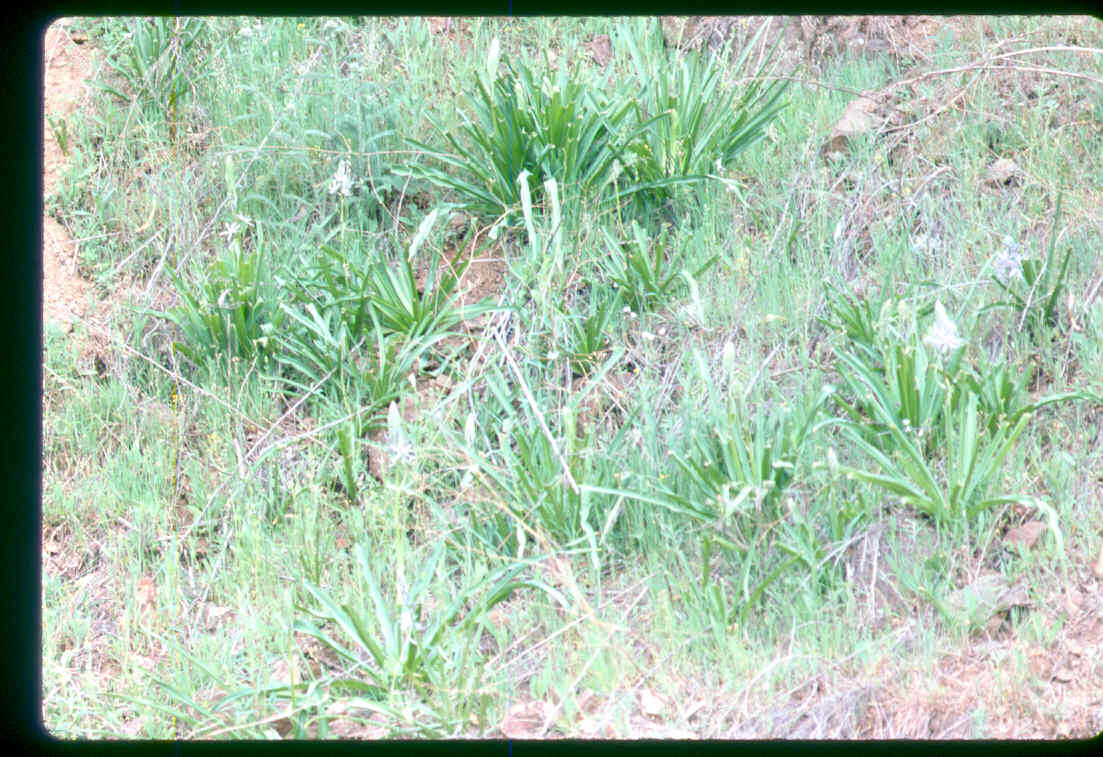
Camassia cusickii in the wild in South West Idaho

== Naming Origin ==
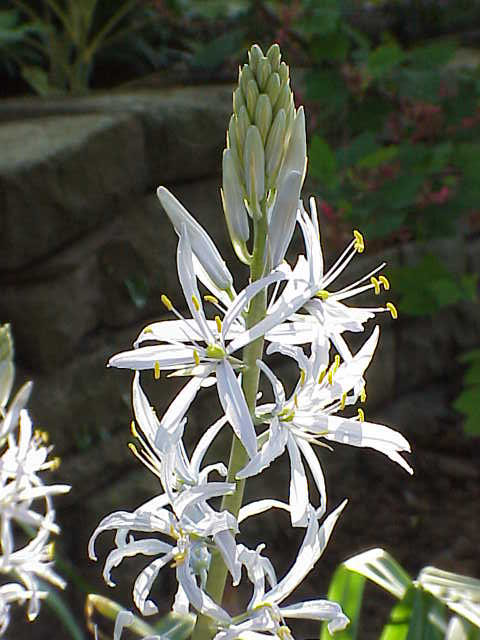
Camassia cusickii

The botanical name is derived from Native American words for this plant, 'quamash,' even though this plant was only a sister plant to the actual plant that was eaten. On the flower there is also a very attractive darker blue selection, 'Zwanenburg', which is named after the place in Haarlem, in the Netherlands, where the famous van Tubergen bulb nursery was based for many years. The botanist Sereno Watson is credited with naming this plant, using specimens collected by William C Cusick in May and October, 1886, "on the slopes of the Eagle Creek Mountains" as Watson has it in the published description of the species.

C. cusickii is sometimes confused with wild hyacinth, however, it is the close relative, Camassia scilloides, that is considered the wild hyacinth according to botanists.
