= Camassia esculenta =

The botanical name Camassia esculenta is a non-accepted name that may refer to two separate species of the genus Camassia;

- Camassia quamash subsp. quamash, synonym Camassia esculenta (Nutt.) Lindl.
- Camassia scilloides, synonym Camassia esculenta (Ker Gawl.) B.L.Rob., (nom. illeg.)
