= Hughes Mountain =

Mountain in Washington County, Missouri

Coordinates: 37°48′07″N 90°42′35″W

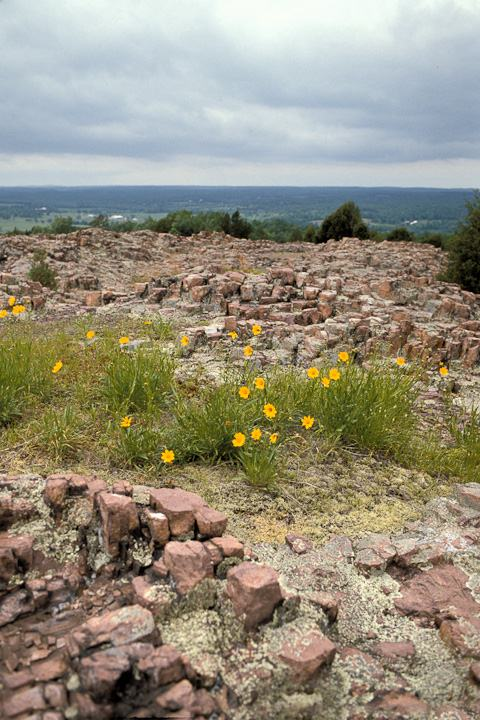
The Devil's Honeycomb, Hughes Mountain State Natural Area

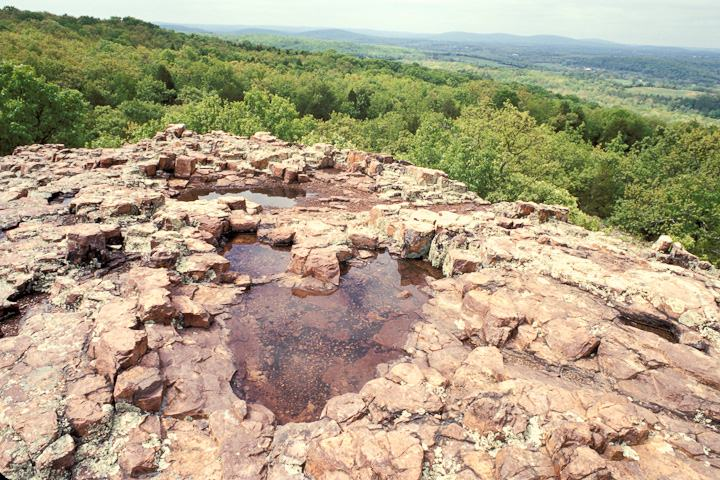
The Devil's Honeycomb, Hughes Mountain State Natural Area

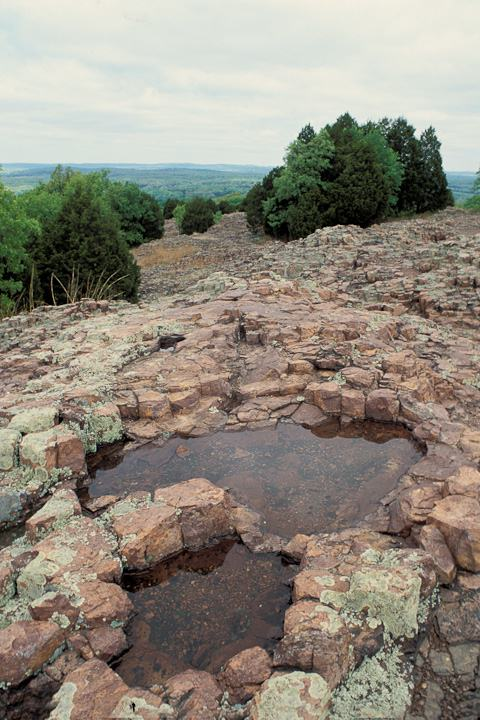
The Devil's Honeycomb, Hughes Mountain State Natural Area

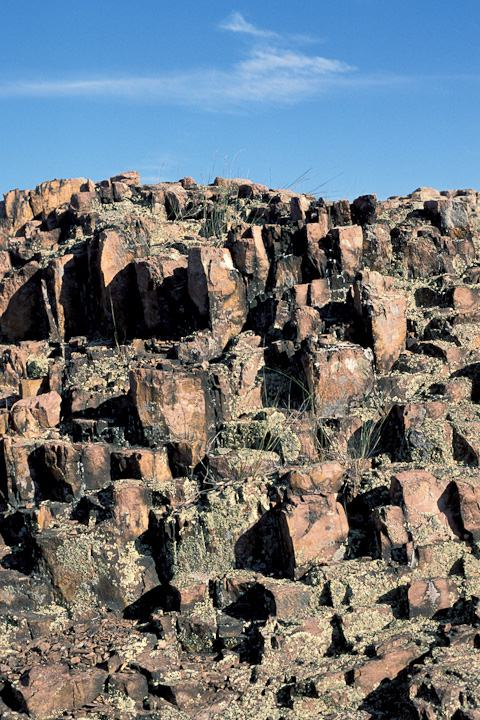
The Devil's Honeycomb, Hughes Mountain State Natural Area

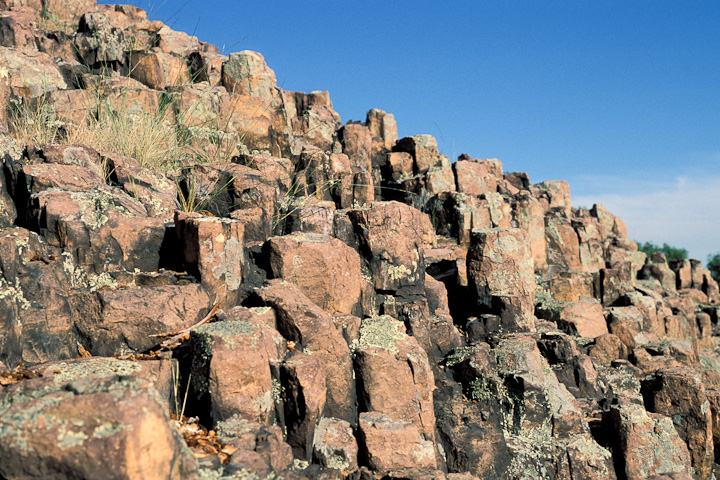
Columnar jointing of rhyolite, Devil's Honeycomb, Hughes Mountain State Natural Area

Hughes Mountain and the Hughes Mountain State Natural Area are located in southern Washington County, Missouri (Sections 28 and 33, T36N R3E) just south of the Big River and Highway M on Cedar Creek Road in the St. Francois Mountains range of The Ozarks. The mountain reaches an elevation of just over 1,200 feet, rising 430 feet above the Big River. The Hughes Mountain Natural Area of the Missouri Department of Conservation encompasses 462 acres (1.87 km^{2}) of the mountain, including the rhyolite glade at its top.

== History ==
The area around Hughes Mountain was first settled ca 1810 by John Hughes, his wife (Susannah) and their children, resulting in the mountain being named Hughes Mountain. The mountain itself remained public land until 1861 when purchased by John Hughes's son, Mahlon Hughes and afterwards remained in the Hughes family until it was purchased by the Missouri Conservation Commission in 1982. At that time it was designated a State Natural Area.

== Hughes Mountain State Natural Area ==
The Hughes Mountain State Natural Area can be accessed by the public via a 1.4 mile (2.253 kilometers) linear/loop trail with the trail head in a small parking area on Highway M 3 miles (4.8 km) southeast of Irondale. Within the Hughes Mountain Natural Area is a glade with an outcrops of Precambrian rhyolite displaying columnar jointing, and designated the Devil's Honeycomb. Devil's Honeycomb is listed in the book, Geographic Wonders and Curiosities of Missouri. The natural area is divided between forest land (about 2/3 the total area) containing three types of forests, and glades (about 1/3 the total area).

== Flora and fauna ==
The forest contains mainly post oaks, white oaks, stunted blackjack oaks, eastern red cedar, black hickory, farkleberry, winged elm, lowbush blueberry, service berry, red elm, sassafras, winged sumac and aromatic sumac. The glade flora includes rushfoil, rough buttonweed, broomsedge, poverty grass, yellow star grass, little bluestem, flame flowers, prickly pear cactus, spider wort, wild hyacinth, lance leaf coreopsis, pine-weed and a variety of lichen. Fauna species include two species of lizards, fence and collared, lichen grasshoppers, and prairie warblers.

== Geology ==
Hughes Mountain is a peak in the St. Francois Mountains Range of southeastern Missouri. These granite and rhyolite rocks of these mountains formed 1.485 billion years ago during the Proterozoic Eon when the area was volcanically active. Hughes Mountain is formed of extrusive rhyolite which fractured into vertical joints when it cooled, creating polygonal columns. These columns have from four to six sides and are up to three feet (0.91 m) tall. When viewed from above they resemble a honeycomb.

Columnar jointing is not limited to rhyolite formations. The Devils Honeycomb is a smaller example of the sort of columnar jointing found at Devils Tower National Monument in Wyoming, Devils Postpile National Monument in California, and the Giant's Causeway near Bushmills, Northern Ireland.
