= Camash =

Camash can refer to

- the perennial herb Camassia quamash
- a name for Commagene, the northern province of Syria, in the late 19th century
- a name for the city of Samosata in the late 19th century
