= Nativar =

Native plant genetically modified to fit certain desired traits

A nativar is a horticulturally bred strain of a plant species, and distinguishes them from their natively bred counterparts. Nativar is a portmanteau of the words 'native' and 'cultivar'; such plants may have different genetic traits from those formerly prevalent in the wild. The difference between a 'nativar' and a 'cultivar' is if the species is grown within its native historic range. Often the goal of using nativars within their historic species range is to reintroduce their ecological benefit into the local ecology. The ecological consequences and benefits of nativars is a widely discussed concept within gardening and horticultural communities, as the capacity of nativar plants to fit the ecological niche of their native counterpart may be manipulated during the breeding process.

Nativars are developed for a variety of reasons, including disease resistance, pest resistance, drought tolerance. Within the horticulture industry, nativars are often developed mostly for aesthetic reasons, such as improving bloom and foliage size, shape, form or scent; as well as improved growth habits for a garden setting. Nativars are also developed within the agriculture and forestry industries for improved yield, flavor and quality. Lastly, nativars have been developed for restoration purposes, for example nativars of the American chestnut (Castanea dentata) are in development to improve disease resistance to the chestnut blight, in hopes of re-establishing native populations.

== Pollinator relationships ==
One ecological niche that can be manipulated during the breeding and cultivation process is the capacity for a plant species to fit the needs of pollinator species that have coevolved to rely on them. Pollinator visitation rates of nativar plants may be increased, decreased, or unchanged relative to their wild-type native counterparts depending on altered factors such as bloom time, color, and shape.

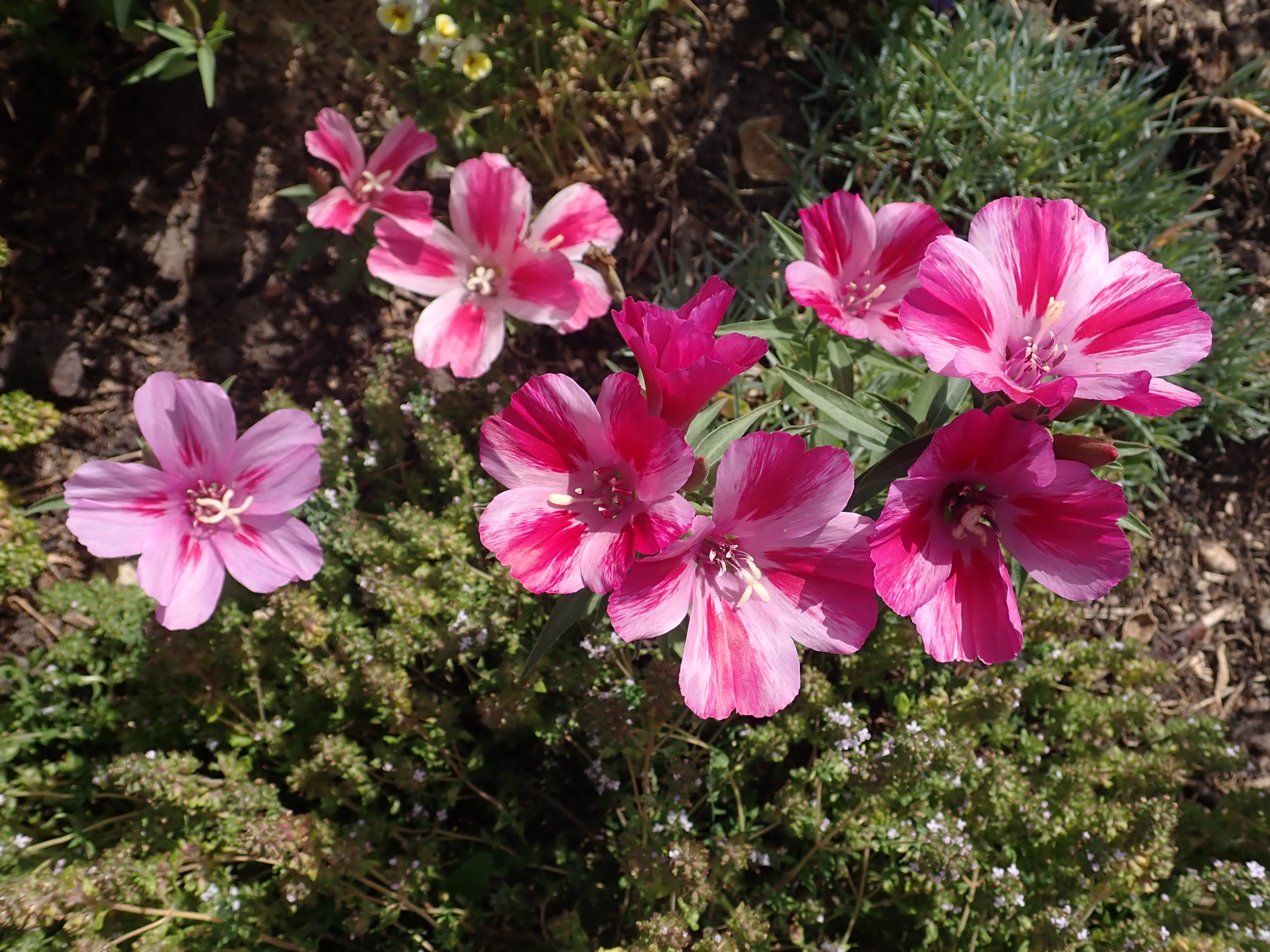
Wild-type Godetia (left) compared to a nativar variety (right) bred for altered bloom color.

Nativars that dramatically change the bloom color of the species, compared to wild naturally occurring wild-type populations, are likely to disrupt the ability of native pollinators to recognize the flowers as forage source. Cultivars of the plant Godetia, (Clarkia amoena) which naturally has pink flowers, alter the blooms to be red, coral or white; and show significantly reduced visitation rates from native bees compared to the pink wild-type, suggesting that native pollinators do not recognize these nativars as a food source, and thus the nativars have reduced ecological benefits compared to their wild-type.

The ecological benefit of nativars can also be reduced due to diminished nectar and pollen production and flower form. For instance, cultivars of the ornamental cherry (Prunus serrulata) express significantly reduced nectar and pollen production, which may pose a risk for native pollinators that visit the blooms for food. Furthermore, the specific variety 'Kanzan' expresses a double-flowered mutation where the reproductive organs and nectaries of each bloom is covered in extra petals, which renders the blooms to have significantly reduced pollinator value and visitation rates.

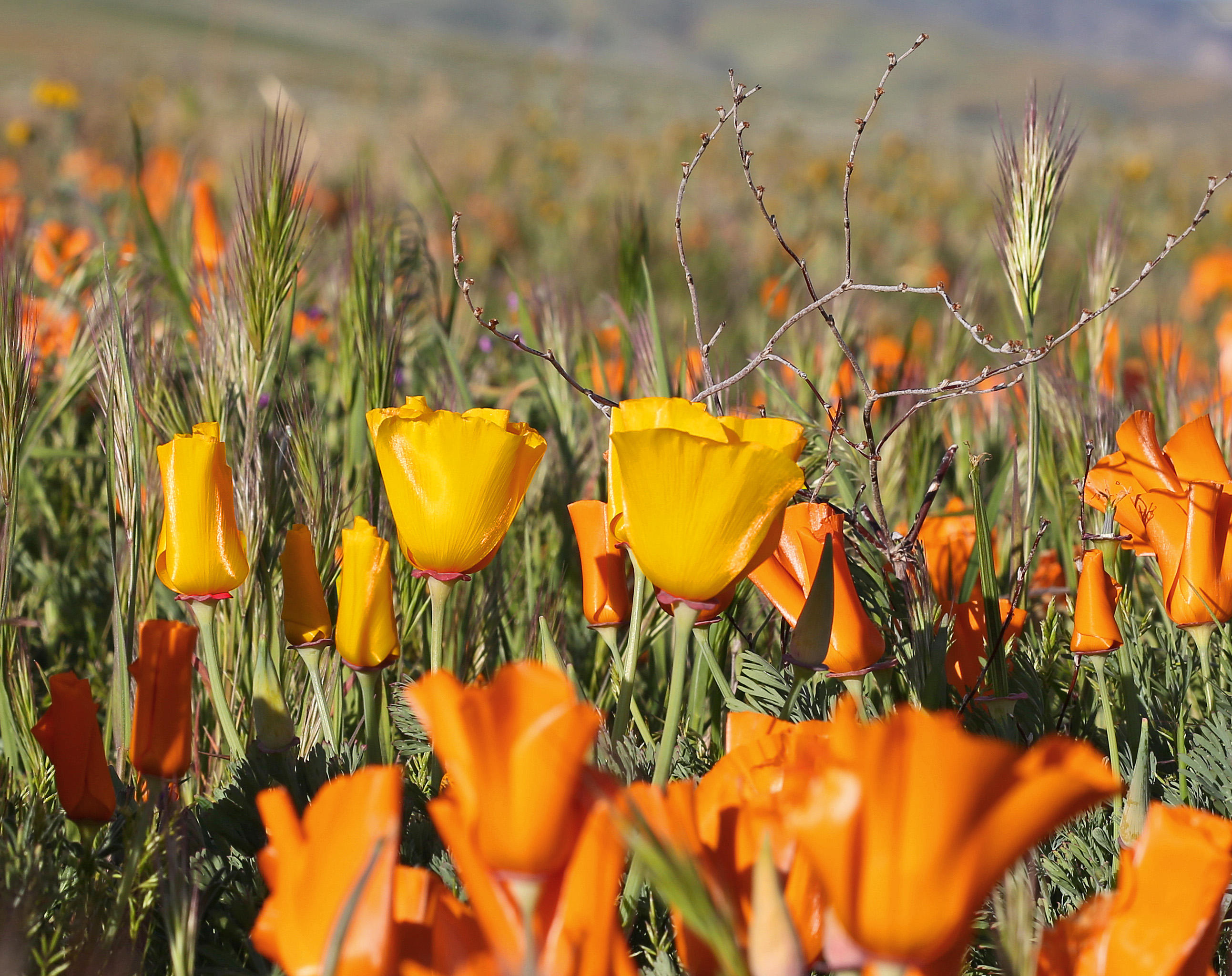
Wild California Poppies with a naturally occurring yellow phenotype surrounded by orange phenotypes.

However, not all cultivars that alter the bloom color from the most abundant naturally occurring flowers result in decreased ecological relationships. For example, with the California poppy (Eschscholzia californica), pollinator visitation rates are comparable between the wild-type orange blooms and a yellow blooming cultivar. This is likely because a less-abundant yellow morph of the species still frequently occurs throughout wild populations, leading for it to still be recognizable for native pollinators. Similarly, nativars within a species may have negligible morphological changes, such as those of the Douglas aster (Symphyotrichum subspicatum) who alter the bloom color from a pastel purple to white. Because the nativar's traits are so similar to the wild-type, it is likely that pollinators still recognize the species as a food source, which would explain the similar pollinator visitation rates between the wild-type and the nativar.

Nativars may also increase the ecological benefit of a species for pollinators by altering other factors about bloom time. In the species great camass (Camassia leichtlinii), despite white-blooming nativars expressing a different color from the naturally occurring blue wild type, the pollinator benefit of the nativar is greater than the wild-type as the bloom period is longer. This suggests that native pollinators still recognize the nativar as a food source, and that the extended bloom time allows for greater visitation overall.

== Larval host relationships ==
Another important ecological function that nativars can provide is that of acting as a larval host plant. These species co-evolved with insects, these insects will rely on the defensive chemicals produced by the plants for their development. Some studies show that nativars are less beneficial for their ecosystems due to phenotypic manipulation of their ecological niche, while others have found that nativars are still able to fulfill some of these relationships.

Some nativars are still able to fulfill their ecological niche as host plants. For example, even though cultivation and breeding may have altered the defensive chemicals of some milkweed nativars of Asclepias tuberosa and A. incarnata, the nativars were still suitable hosts for Monarch Butterfly larvae. Thus, the ability of these nativars to fulfill their ecological role as host plants was undisturbed by the breeding and cultivation process.

Another example of interference of host plant relationships is found among cultivars of the species common ninebark (Physocarpus opulifolius). While wild-type individuals of this species express green foliage, the nativar 'Dart's Gold' has yellow leaves, and the nativar 'Monlo' has dark purple leaves. A study looking at the feeding resistance and egg-laying preferences of the specialist ninebark beetle (Calligrapha spiraeae), found that these beetles preferred the wild-type and 'Dart's Gold' nativar over the 'Manlo' nativar. This suggests that these beetles may not have recognized the dark purple nativar as a possible host plant, or that the anthocyanin pigments which gave the plant purple foliage acted as a feeding deterrent to the beetle larvae. Thus, the ability for the 'Manlo' nativar to fit its ecological niche is reduced compared to its wild-type counterpart, while the nativar 'Dart's Gold' is still able to fulfill these ecological relationships.

=== Population fitness ===
Nativars can also pose a risk to the survival and fitness of the plant species overall. For instance, the species Clarkia pulchella, which had been farmed for seed production and restoration purposes, expressed significantly decreased survival rates and reproductive fitness after eight generations of reproduction. The decreased fitness resulted in higher mortality rates in situations of drought and extreme wetness, as well as a 3x reduced likelihood of flowering compared to wild populations, which suggests a genetic bottleneck during seed sampling and potential unconscious selection during propagation. This could render wild populations less fit if these seeds were used in restoration purposes because less-fit individuals may cross breed with wild individuals, thus causing genetic drift across the whole population. This genetic drift can reduce genetic diversity across the whole population, and render it less fit to survive extreme conditions or to adapt to changing environmental inputs.

Other studies suggest that nativars are unfit for restoration purposes, and can cause harmful changes in population fitness overall. For example, one study assessed the impacts of cultivars utilized in restoration projects of the species Plantago lanceolata and Lotus corniculatus. The study found that nativars of these species had significantly altered life histories that rendered the cultivars less able to adapt to local climate conditions than their wild-type counterparts. Furthermore, because of hybridization, the progeny of wild-type and nativar crosses had increased vigor, allowing them to out-compete native individuals, but then suffered more under extreme conditions, thus having an overall negative impact on the entire population.

== See also ==
- Introduced species
- Naturalisation (biology)
