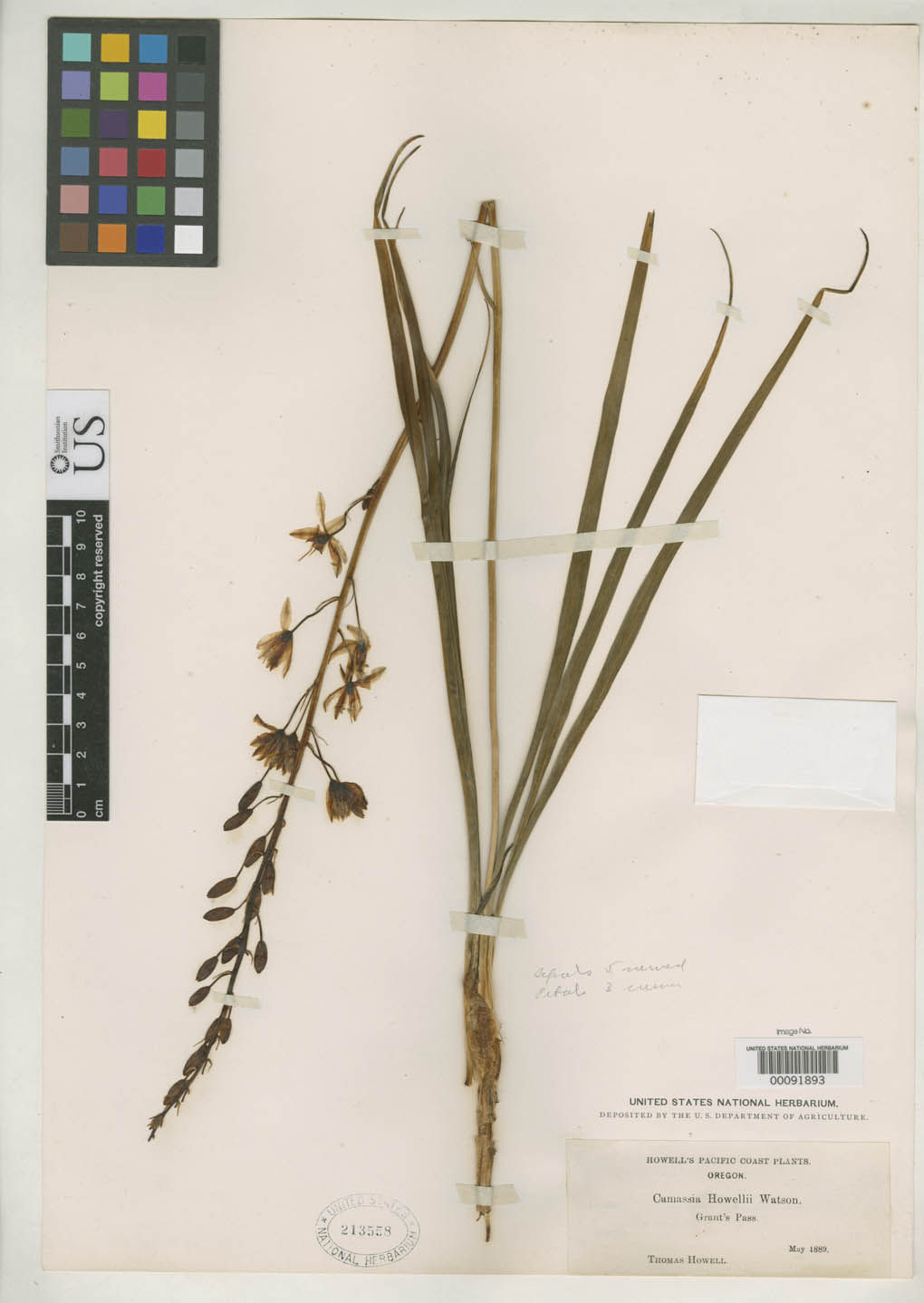
- herbarium specimen at Smithsonian collected in Oregon 1889

Conservation status
- Imperiled (NatureServe)

Scientific classification
- Kingdom: Plantae
- Clade: Tracheophytes
- Clade: Angiosperms
- Clade: Monocots
- Order: Asparagales
- Family: Asparagaceae
- Subfamily: Agavoideae
- Genus: Camassia
- Species: C. howellii

Binomial name
- Camassia howellii S. Watson 1890

Synonyms
- Quamasia howellii (S.Watson) Coville

= Camassia howellii =

Howell's camas

Species of flowering plant

Camassia howellii, commonly known as Howell's camas, is a species of perennial flowering plant in the family Asparagaceae endemic to western Oregon.

Discovered in 1889, Camassia howellii is now considered to be imperiled due to residential development, mining and grazing.

== Distribution ==
Camassia howellii is found exclusively in the southwestern region of Oregon, almost only in Josephine county, including on Grants Pass and Sexton Mountain. The 12 populations make up a total of 3000 plants. These sites are threatened by human developments. This species is currently under the global conservation status rank G2 Imperiled. Although other species of Camassia are still abundant in the Northwest, this one is not in Oregon.

Camassia howellii thrives in wet meadows in serpentine soil. They are found in eastern Oregon where precipitation levels range from 70 to 100 inches per year and temperatures from 40 to 80 degrees Fahrenheit per year. These perennials are late bloomers usually during the month of May and the flowers will wither in the autumn. The common elevation is between 200 and 700 meters high.

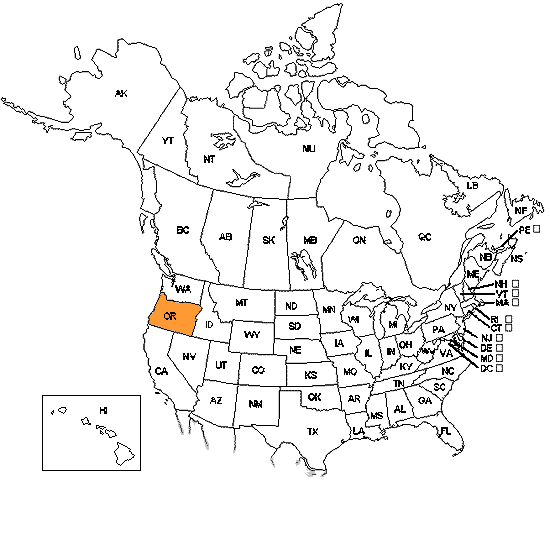
Map of distribution

== Description ==
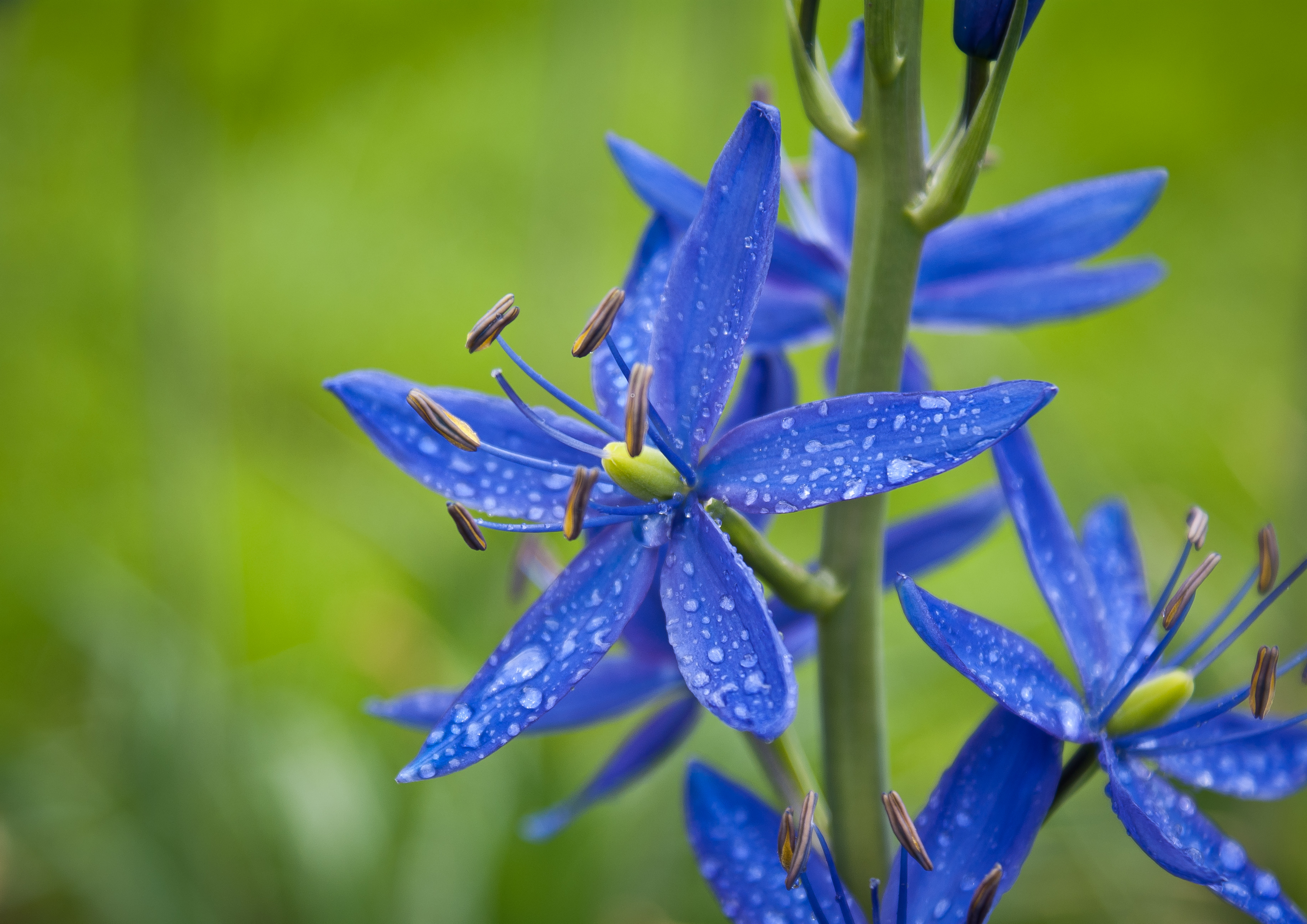
Camassia howellii

Camassia howellii grows from a bulb and has 60 cm long basal leaves which range around 4 to 7 per plant.

The plant's inflorescences reach about 15 to 40 cm (6 to 15.5 in) long which are usually bluish violet. The flowers are actinomorphic made up of five 20 mm (0.79 in) long petals. There can be 100 flowers in a raceme. These flowers sit atop a stem about 50 cm (19.5 in) tall. The flowers are radially symmetrical and are composed of five deep bluish violet petals. The petals range from 10 to 20 mm long and about 3 to 5 mm wide. This species is known to bloom in the month of May. The small bulbs are between 1.5 and 3 centimeters in diameter, and have a brown coat. The few, narrow leaves are between 20 and 60 centimeters in length. The capsule fruit is between 0.5 and 1 centimeter in long, shiny green in color, and has 2 to 5 seeds per fruit. It has smaller capsules and wider spreading pedicels compared to other Camassia species.

== Uses ==
Native Americans and settlers considered Camassia howellii as an important part of their diet. The city of Camas in Washington and many parts of the Northwestern United States was named after this plant due to its large cultivation and consumption by the Native Americans and first white settlers.

In autumn the bulbs were harvested after the flowers dried up and were boiled or pit-cooked. The bulbs were also dried and ground into flour. As the settlers began to expand their territory, they raised cattle which limited the growth of camas in the area.
