= Naturalisation (biology) =

Ecological processes

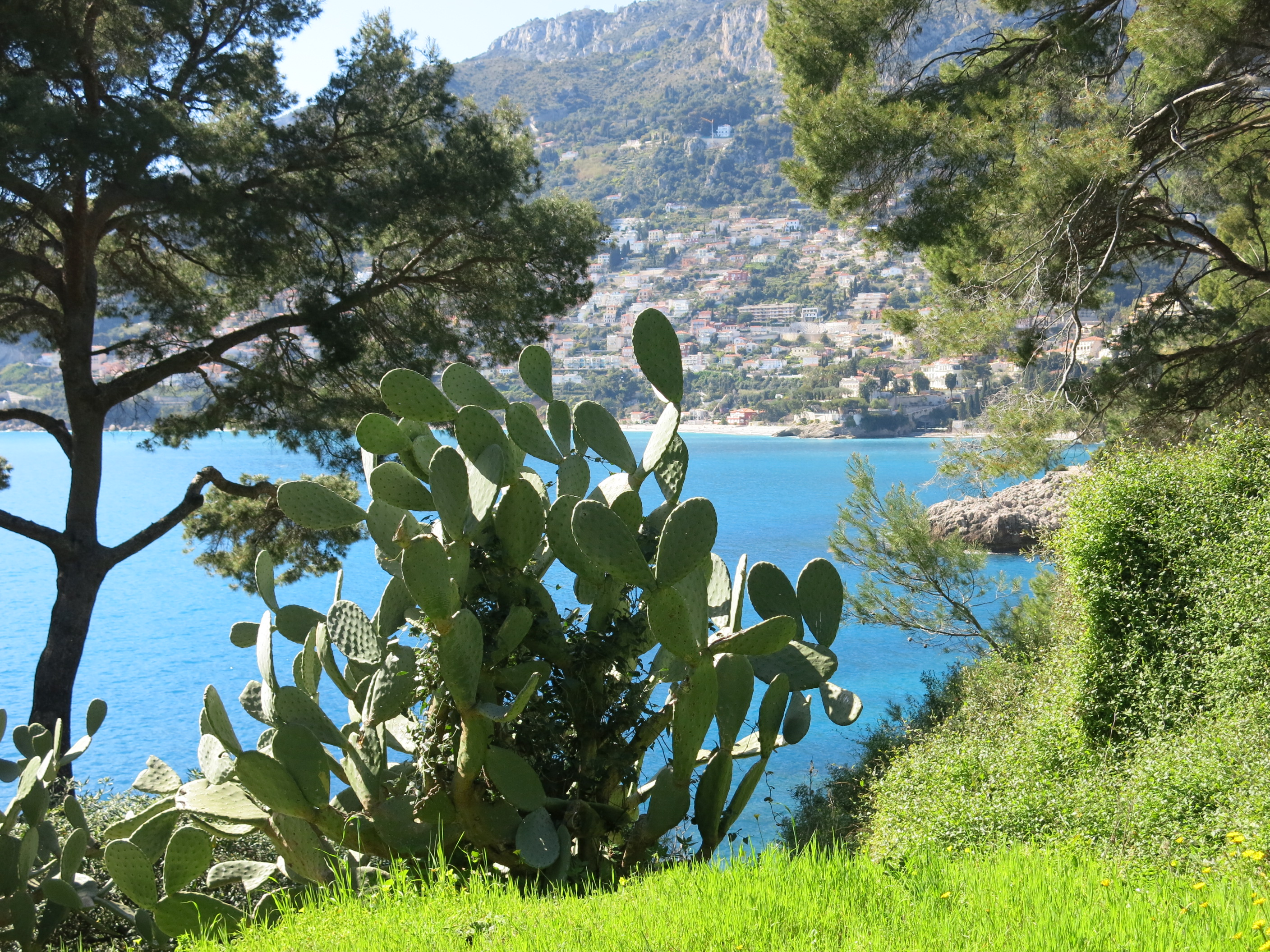
The prickly pear cactus, which is native to the Americas, in France in 2015.

Naturalisation (or naturalization) is the ecological process by which a species, taxon, or population of exotic—as opposed to native—origin becomes integrated into a given ecosystem. Through this process, the organism establishes self-sustaining populations, becoming capable of reproducing, growing, and disseminating spontaneously without continued human assistance. In some cases, a species’ presence in an ecosystem is so ancient that it becomes impossible to determine with certainty whether it is native or the result of a historical introduction. Such taxa may be regarded as naturalised when their origin cannot be conclusively established.

Generally, any introduced species may (in the wild) either go extinct or naturalise in its new environment.

Some populations do not sustain themselves reproductively, but exist because of continued influx from elsewhere. Such a non-sustaining population, or the individuals within it, are said to be adventive. Cultivated plants, sometimes called nativars, are a major source of adventive populations.

== Botany ==
In botany, naturalisation is the situation in which an exogenous plant reproduces and disperses on its own in a new environment. For example, Thuja plicata is naturalised in the United Kingdom, where it reproduces on its own, while it is not in France, where human intervention via cuttings or seeds is essential for its dissemination.

Two categories of naturalisation are defined from two distinct parameters; one, archaeonaturalised, refers to introduction before a given time (introduced over a hundred years ago), while the second, amphinaturalised or eurynaturalised, implies a notion of spatial extension (taxon assimilated indigenous and present over a vast space, opposed to stenonaturalised).

=== Degrees of naturalisation ===
The degrees of naturalisation are defined in relation to the status of nativity or introduction of taxons or species:

- Accidental taxon: non-native taxon growing spontaneously, which appears sporadically as a result of accidental introduction due to human activities (as opposed to intentional introductions)
- Subspontaneous taxon: taxon naturalised following an introduction of accidental origin (fortuitous introduction linked to human activities) or unknown, and which, after acclimatisation, can reproduce like native plants but is still poorly established
- Spontaneous taxon: native or non-native taxon growing and reproducing naturally, without intentional human intervention in the territory considered, and is well established (mixes with local flora or fauna)

== Zoology ==
Animal naturalisation is mainly carried out through breeding and by commensalism following human migrations.

The concerned species are thus:

- either introduced voluntarily into an ecosystem where they are not native;
- either accidentally introduced or become feral;
- or by naturally following human migratory flows by commensalism (eg: arrival of house sparrow in Western Europe following Huns, and previously in Eastern Europe from Asia Minor in Antiquity).

It sometimes happens that a naturalised species hybridises with a native.

== Introduction and origin areas ==
The introduction site or introduction area is the place or, in a broader way, the new environment where the candidate species for naturalisation takes root. It is generally opposed to the origin area, where this same species is native.

There is also a more ambiguous notion that is the "natural distribution area" or "natural distribution range", particularly when it comes to anthropophilic species or some species benefiting from anthropogenic land settlement (canals, bridges, deforestation, etc.) that have connected two previously isolated areas (e.g. the Suez Canal, which causes Lessepsian migration).

== Impact on the ecosystem ==
Naturalisation is sometimes done with human help in order to replace another species having suffered directly or indirectly from anthropogenic activities, or deemed less profitable for human use.

Naturalised species may become invasive species if they become sufficiently abundant to have an adverse effect on native species (e.g. microbes affected by invasive plants) or on biotope.

Examples of naturalised species that have become invasive include the European rabbit, native to Europe and which abounds in Australia; or the Japanese knotweed which is invading Europe and America where it is considered to be amongst the one hundred most invasive species in the 21st century. Apart from direct competition between native and introduced populations, genetic pollution by hybridisation can add up cumulatively to environmental effects that compromise the conservation of native populations.

Some naturalised species, such as palms, can act as ecosystem engineers, by changing the habitat and creating new niches that can sometimes have positive effects on an ecosystem. Potential and/or perceived positive impacts of naturalised species are less studied than potential and/or perceived negative impacts.

However, the impact on local species is not easy to assess in a short period. For instance, the African sacred ibis (Threskiornis aethiopicus) escaped in 1990 from an animal park in Morbihan (France), gave rise to an eradication campaign in 2008. In 2013, however, the CNRS stated that this bird species is not a threat in France, and may even promote Eurasian spoonbill and limit the development of the invasive Louisiana crayfish.

== See also ==
- Adventive plant
- Adventive species
- Colonisation (biology)
- Cosmopolitan distribution
- Endemism
- Hemerochory
- Indigenous (ecology)
