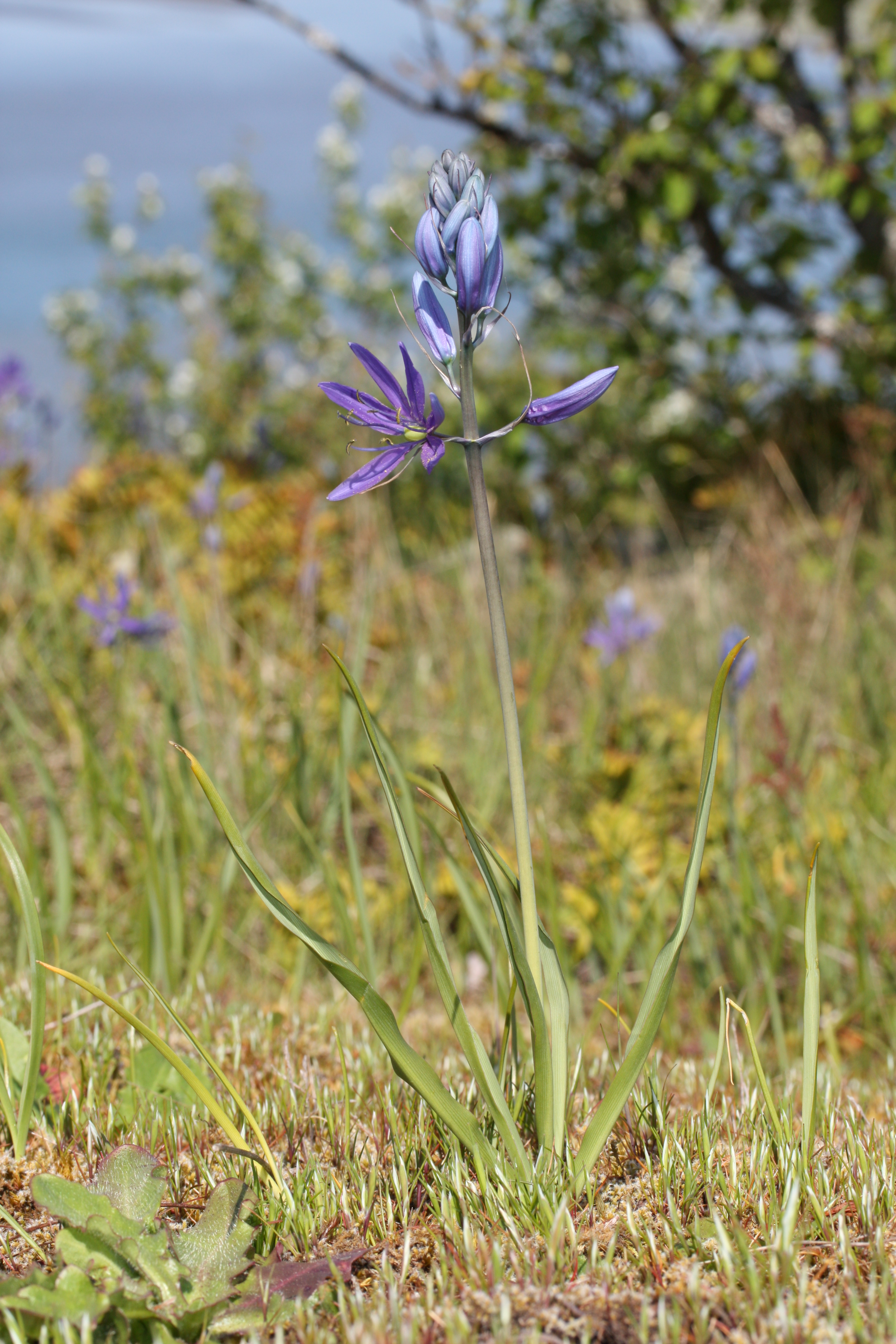
- Indian camas (Camassia quamash)

Scientific classification
- Kingdom: Plantae
- Clade: Tracheophytes
- Clade: Angiosperms
- Clade: Monocots
- Order: Asparagales
- Family: Asparagaceae
- Subfamily: Agavoideae
- Genus: Camassia; Lindl.

Type species
- Camassia quamash (Pursh) Greene

Synonyms
- Stilla W.Young; Cyanotris Raf.; Bulbedulis Raf.; Kweetla Raf.; Lemotrys Raf.; Quamasia Raf.; Sitocodium Salisb.

= Camassia =

Genus of plants

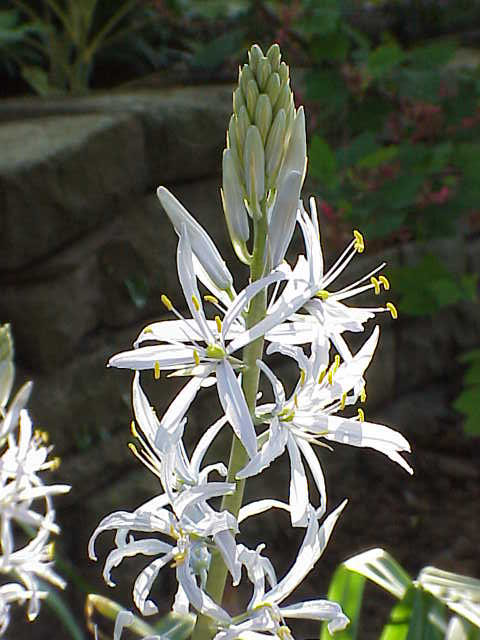
Cusick's camas (Camassia cusickii)

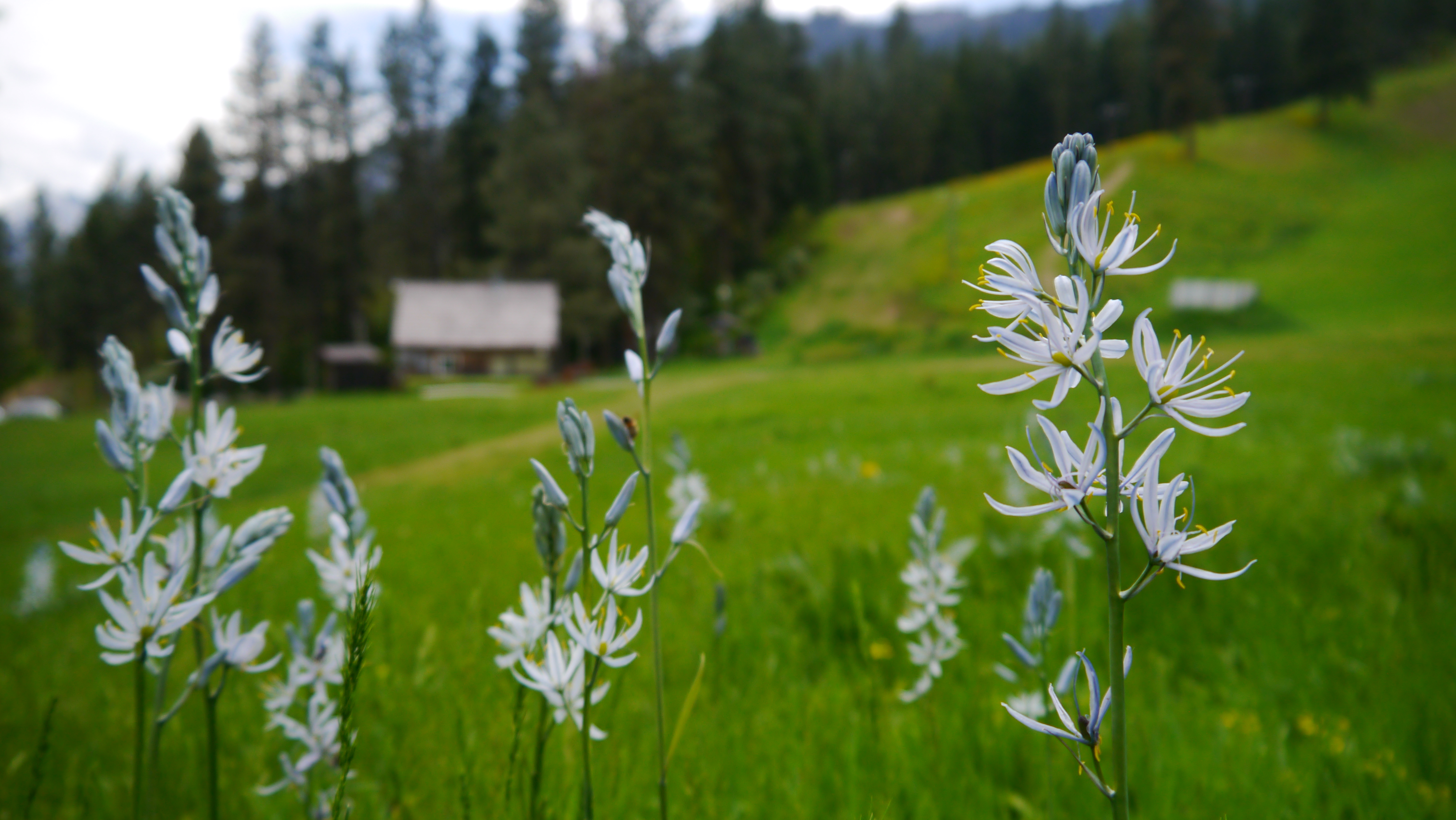
Common camas (Camassia quamash ssp. quamash)

Camassia is a genus of bulbous flowering plants in the Asparagaceae (or asparagus family) native to North America. Common names include camas, quamash, and camash, or alternatively Indian or wild hyacinth.

It grows in the wild in great numbers in moist meadows. They are perennial plants with basal linear leaves measuring 20 to 80 centimetres (8 to 32 in) in length, which emerge early in the spring. They grow to a height of 30 to 130 cm (12 to 50 in), with a multi-flowered stem rising above the main plant in summer. The six-petaled flowers vary in color from pale lilac or white to deep purple or blue-violet. Camas can appear to color entire meadows when in flower.

== Taxonomy and species ==
Historically, the genus was placed in the lily family (Liliaceae), when this was very broadly defined to include most lilioid monocots. When the Liliaceae was split, in some treatments Camassia was placed in a family called Hyacinthaceae (now the subfamily Scilloideae). DNA and biochemical studies have led the Angiosperm Phylogeny Group to reassign Camassia to the family Asparagaceae, subfamily Agavoideae.

=== Species ===
The World Checklist of Selected Plant Families recognizes six species as of April 2025:

Image	Name	Distribution
	Camassia angusta (Engelm. & A.Gray) Blank. - prairie camas	southern Great Plains + mid-Mississippi Valley (Texas, Oklahoma, Louisiana, Arkansas, Missouri, Kansas, Iowa, Illinois, Indiana)
	Camassia cusickii S.Watson - Cusick's camas	northeastern Oregon, west-central Idaho
	Camassia howellii S.Watson - Howell's camas	southwestern Oregon
	Camassia leichtlinii (Baker) S.Watson - large camas, great camas	British Columbia, Washington, Oregon, northern + central California, Washoe County in Nevada
	Camassia quamash (Pursh) Greene - quamash, Indian camas, small camas	western Canada (British Columbia, Alberta), western United States (California, Oregon, Washington, Nevada, Idaho, Montana, Wyoming, Utah)
	Camassia scilloides (Raf.) Cory - Atlantic camas, bear grass	eastern + Central North America from Maryland to Georgia, westward to Texas and north into Ontario.

formerly included

The name Camassia biflora was coined in 1969 for a South American species now known as Oziroe biflora.

=== Synonyms ===
The term Camassia esculenta is a confusing one. Not an accepted name, it has been used twice, both for Camassia quamash and for Camassia scilloides. Consequently, the reference to Camassia esculenta (Ker Gawl.) B.L.Rob. as a synonym for C. scilloides is deemed illegitimate, while reference to Camassia esculenta (Nutt.) Lindl. is a non-accepted name (synonym) for C. quamash subsp. quamash. Hence the continuing horticultural usage without qualification is potentially confusing.

== Cultivation and uses ==
=== Indigenous methods of cultivation ===
Indigenous peoples of the Pacific Northwest engaged in active management and cultivation of blue camas (Kweetla). They used controlled burning to clear land and improve growing conditions. While blue camas plots occurred naturally in the Pacific Northwest, Indigenous peoples would maintain a plot through weeding, tilling, harvesting Camas bulbs, and replanting. Camas plots were harvested by individuals or kin-groups, who were recognized as a particular plot's cultivators or stewards. Stewardship was typically lineage-based, and cultivation rights to a particular plot were fiercely guarded. Multiple generations would often harvest the same Camas plot. Plots have been recorded as possessing physical boundary markers, and there were social consequences for harvesting from a plot that was recognized as being maintained by a particular individual or kin-group. The camas bulbs were harvested with a pointed wooden tool, with the work of cultivation being done primarily by women.

=== Food use ===
Camassia species were an important food staple for Indigenous peoples and settlers in parts of the American Old West. While Camassia species are edible and nutritious, the white-flowered deathcamas species (which are not in the genus Camassia but in a number of genera in the tribe Melanthieae) that grow in the same areas are toxic, and the bulbs are quite similar in appearance. It is easiest to tell the plants apart when they are in flower.

The quamash was a food source for many indigenous peoples in western North America. Blue camas was harvested when in bloom, in spring or early summer. After being harvested the bulbs were pit-roasted or boiled. A pit-cooked camas bulb can take up to two days to fully cook. The look and taste is something like baked sweet potato, but sweeter, and with more crystalline fibers due to the presence of inulin in the bulbs. The eating of too many such baked bulbs – especially if undercooked – can cause excessive flatulence, due to their containing inulin and other oligosaccharides. After cooking, the bulbs could be pounded into a paste and made into cakes.

Native American peoples who ate camas include the Nez Perce (Nimíipuu), Cree, Kalapuya, Blackfoot, Yakama, and Coast Salish, including the Lekwungen or Songhees who collected camas in what is now Victoria, British Columbia, the Lekwungen name for which was Camosun, or "place to gather camas". The Kutenai called the camas "xapi" (Ktunaxa). Camas bulbs contributed to the survival of members of the Lewis and Clark Expedition.

In the Great Basin, expanded settlement by whites accompanied by turning cattle and hogs onto camas prairies greatly diminished food available to native tribes and increased tension between Native Americans and settlers and travelers. Though the once-immense spreads of camas lands have diminished because of modern developments and agriculture, numerous camas prairies and marshes may still be seen today.

=== Ornamental use ===
This bulb flower naturalizes well in gardens. The bulb grows best in well-drained soil high in humus. It will grow in lightly shaded forest areas and on rocky outcrops as well as in open meadows or prairies. Additionally it is found growing alongside streams and rivers. The plants may be divided in autumn after the leaves have withered. Bulbs should be planted in the autumn. Additionally the plant spreads by seed rather than by runners.

In the United Kingdom, the National Plant Collection of Camassia is held by Hare Spring Cottage Plants in Kingsbridge, South Devon.

== Place names ==
Many areas in the Pacific Northwest are named for the plant, including Camas Valley, Oregon; the city of Camas, Washington; Lacamas Creek in southern Washington; the Camas Prairie in northern Idaho (and its Camas Prairie Railroad); Camas County in southern Idaho; and Kamas, Utah.

== Role in indigenous trade and culture ==
Camas was an important component of the diets of most indigenous groups located in the Pacific Northwest. However, not all indigenous groups harvested camas themselves. Instead, many relied on trade in order to procure it. Indigenous groups that lived in environments that suited camas production, such as the Coast Salish, developed networks of exchange in order to procure a variety of goods and foods, such as cedar bark baskets and dried halibut.

In North American Indigenous cultures, trade had economic as well as diplomatic functions, with ceremonies such as the potlatch serving as a means to legitimize an individual's rule and establish their status as a provider. Camas was frequently traded in large volumes for such occasions.

== Theories of anthropogenic dispersal ==
As indigenous land-management techniques have been theorized as having had a significant impact on the maintenance of the Garry oak ecosystem, one of the primary ecosystems in which Camassia quamash grows, researchers have investigated the potentiality of anthropogenic transport through an investigation of the genetic structure of Camassia quamash. Despite historical evidence for anthropogenic maintenance of camas plots and transportation through Indigenous trade networks, analysis of the genetic structures of Camassia quamash have not substantiated theories of anthropogenic dispersal. The distribution of Camassia quamash across the Pacific Northwest is most likely the result of postglacial migration. These results imply that the degree of anthropogenic dispersal of Camassia quamash that occurred was not of such a scale as to leave a marker in the plant's genetic structure.
