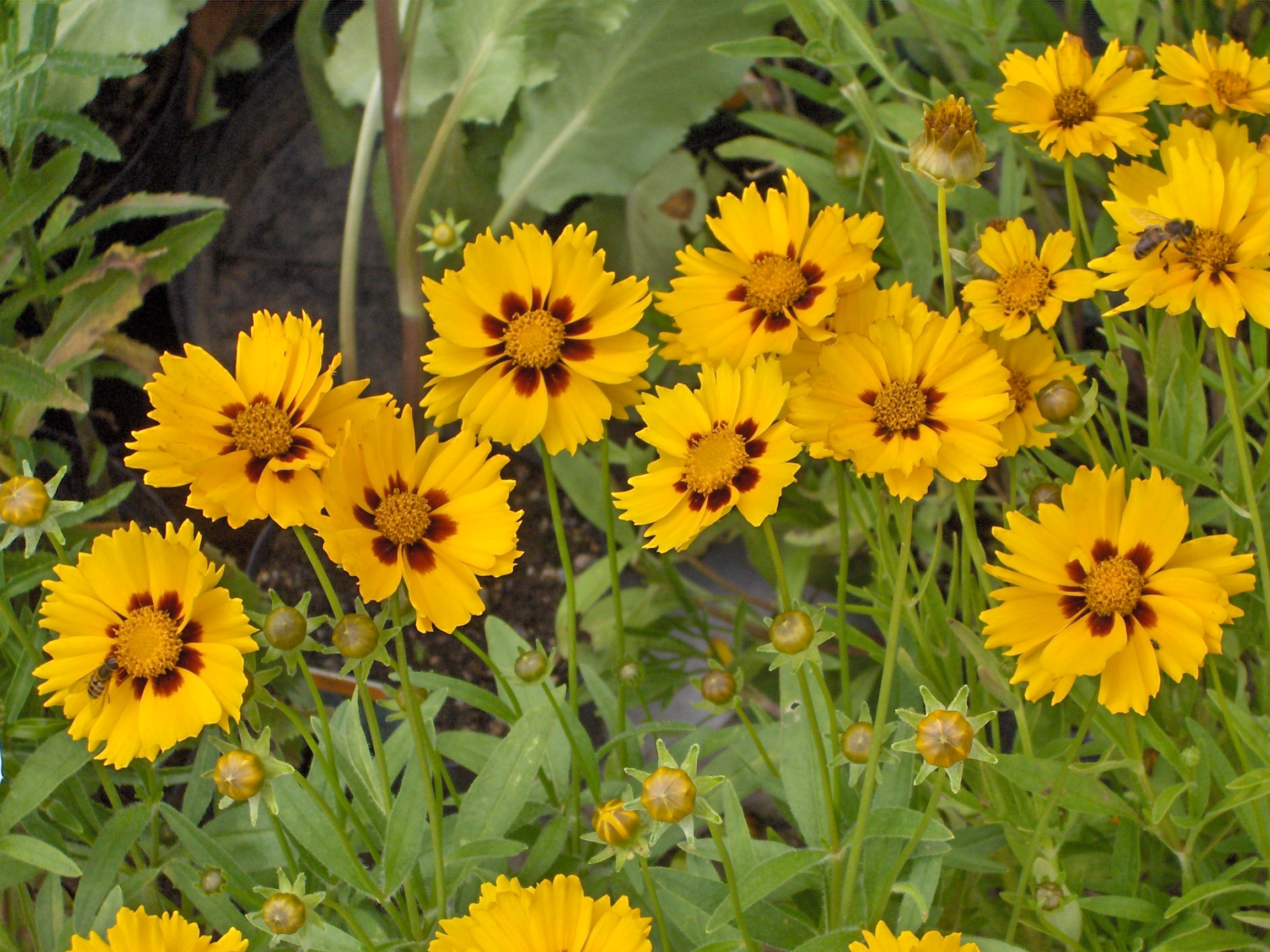
- Coreopsis lanceolata 'Sterntaler'

Conservation status
- Secure (NatureServe)

Scientific classification
- Kingdom: Plantae
- Clade: Tracheophytes
- Clade: Angiosperms
- Clade: Eudicots
- Clade: Asterids
- Order: Asterales
- Family: Asteraceae
- Genus: Coreopsis
- Species: C. lanceolata

Binomial name
- Coreopsis lanceolata L.

Synonyms
- Chrysomelea lanceolata Tausch; Coreopsis crassifolia Dryand. ex Aiton; Coreopsis heterogyna Fernald; Coreopsis lanceolata var. glabella Michx.; Coreopsis lanceolata var. pumila Moldenke; Coreopsis lanceolata var. villosa Michx.; Coreopsis oblongifolia Nutt.; Coreopsoides lanceolata (L.) Moench; Leachia crassifolia Cass.; Leachia lanceolata Cass.; Leachia trifoliata Cass.

= Coreopsis lanceolata =

Species of flowering plant

Coreopsis lanceolata, commonly known as lanceleaf coreopsis, lanceleaf tickseed, lance-leaved coreopsis, or sand coreopsis, is a North American species of tickseed in the family Asteraceae.

== Description ==
Coreopsis lanceolata is a perennial plant sometimes attaining a height of over 60 cm (2 ft). The plant produces yellow flower heads singly at the top of a naked flowering stalk, each head containing both ray florets and disc florets. Each flower measures 5–8 cm (2–3 in) across. Basal leaves are typically narrow, lance-shaped, and 5–15 cm (2–6 in) long with smooth margins. They have thin petioles that are 3–10 cm (1–4 in) long. Leaves higher up the stem are sessile and may be unlobed or pinnately lobed. The stem leaves are opposite and generally appear only on the lower half of the stem. After flowering, the ray florets are replaced by brown achenes that are 3 mm (0.1 in) long and 3 mm (0.1 in) across.

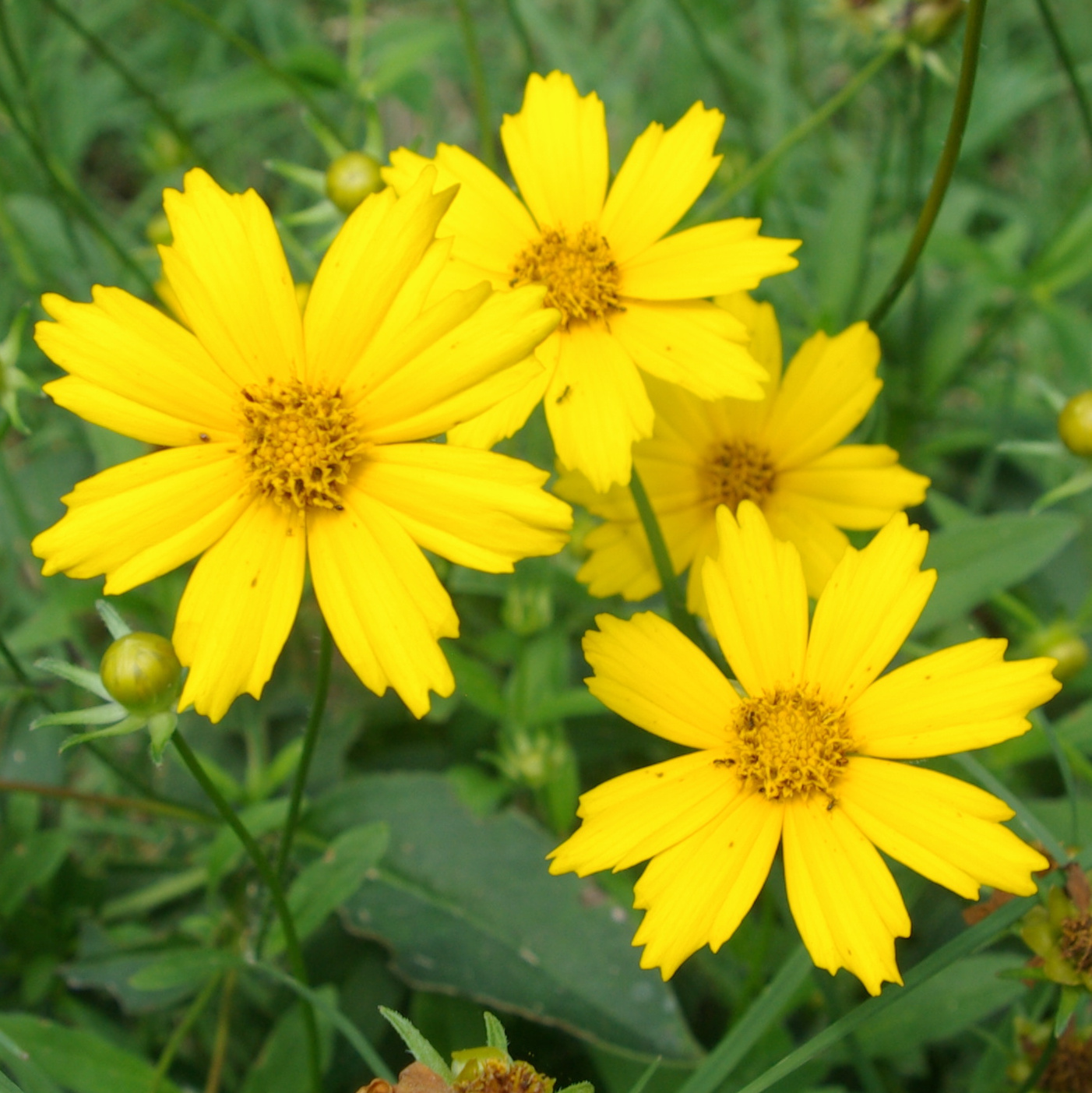
Lanceleaf coreopsis flowers

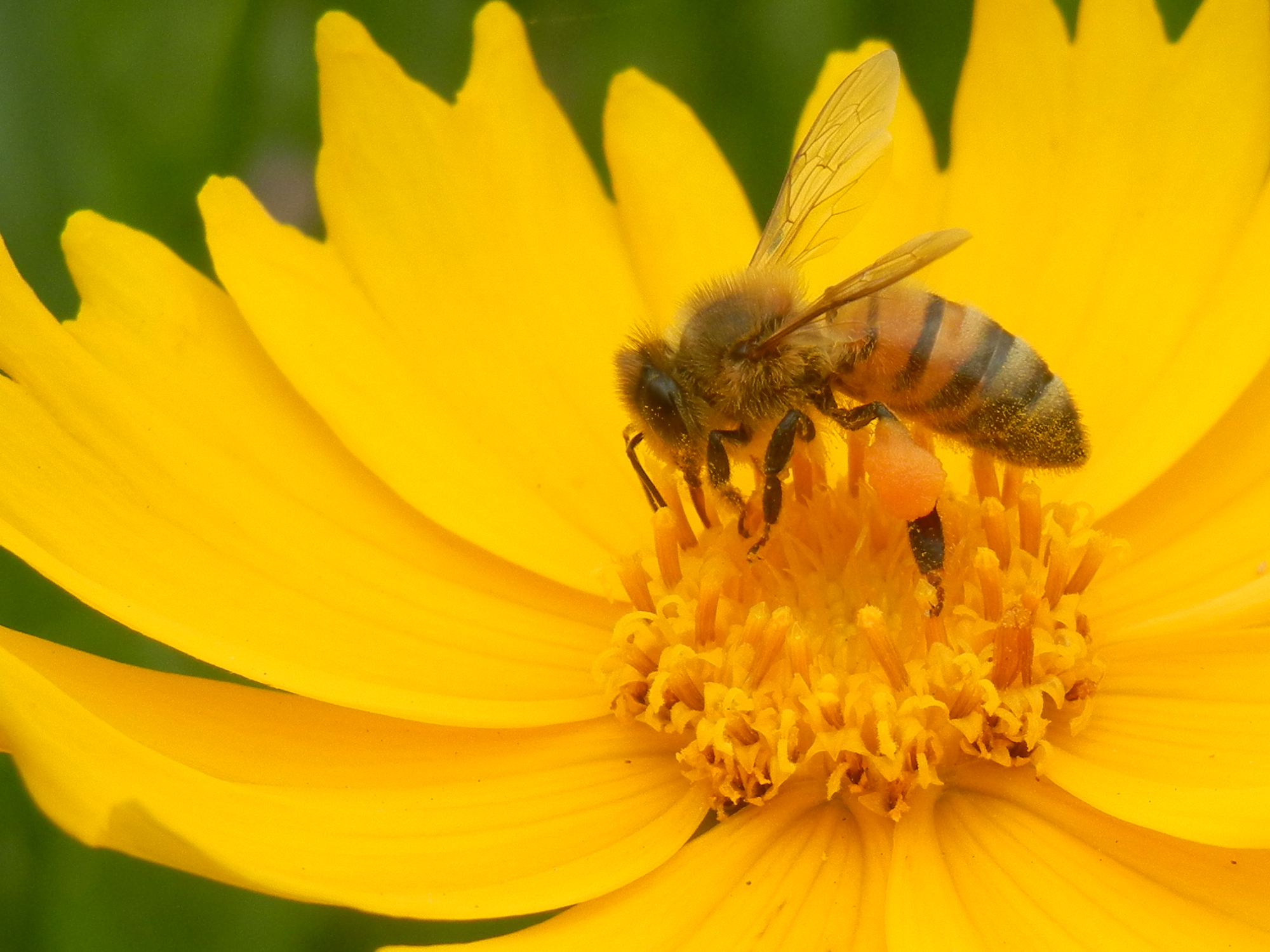
Detail of flowers being pollinated

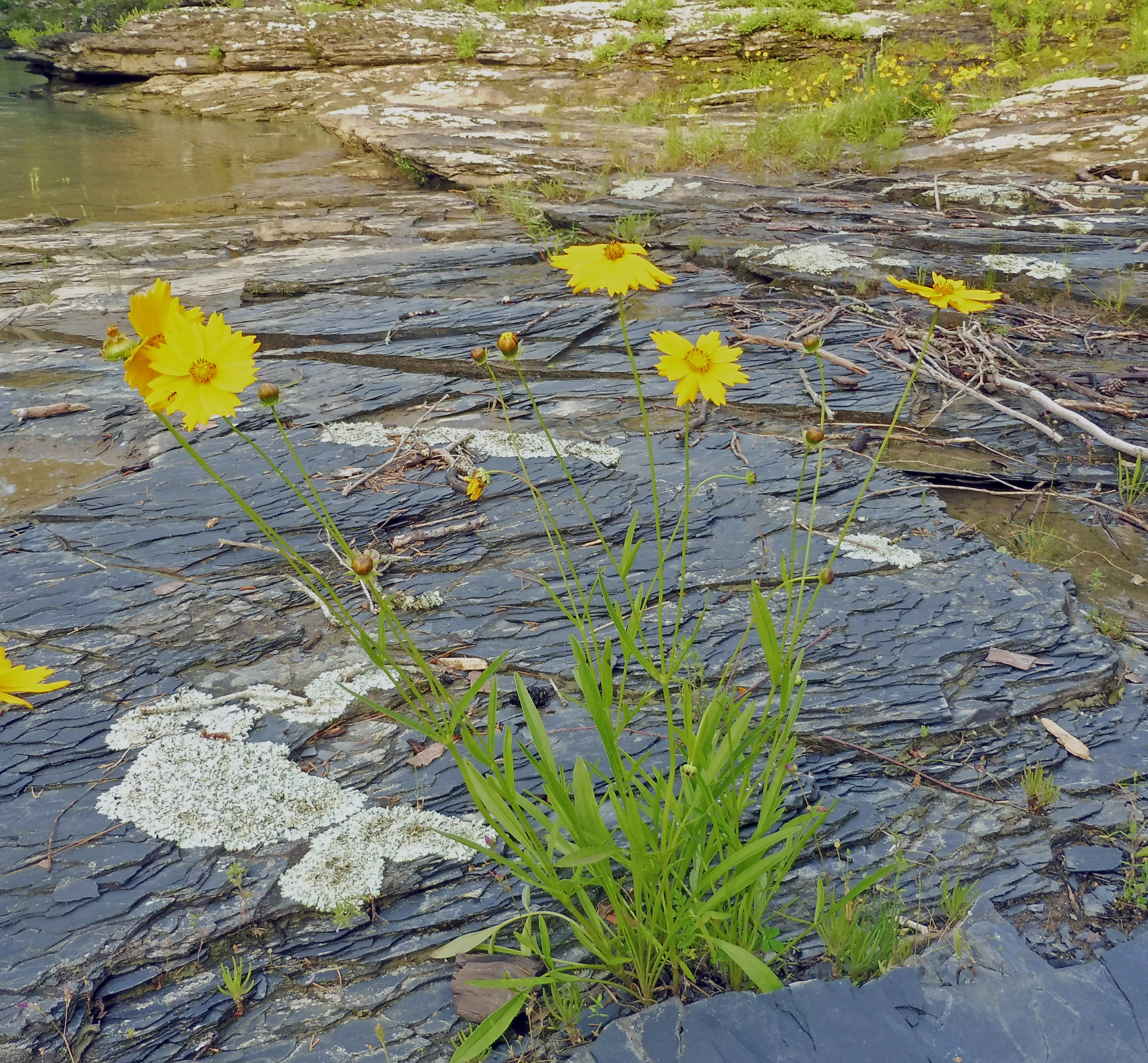
Stem leaves are few and basally disposed

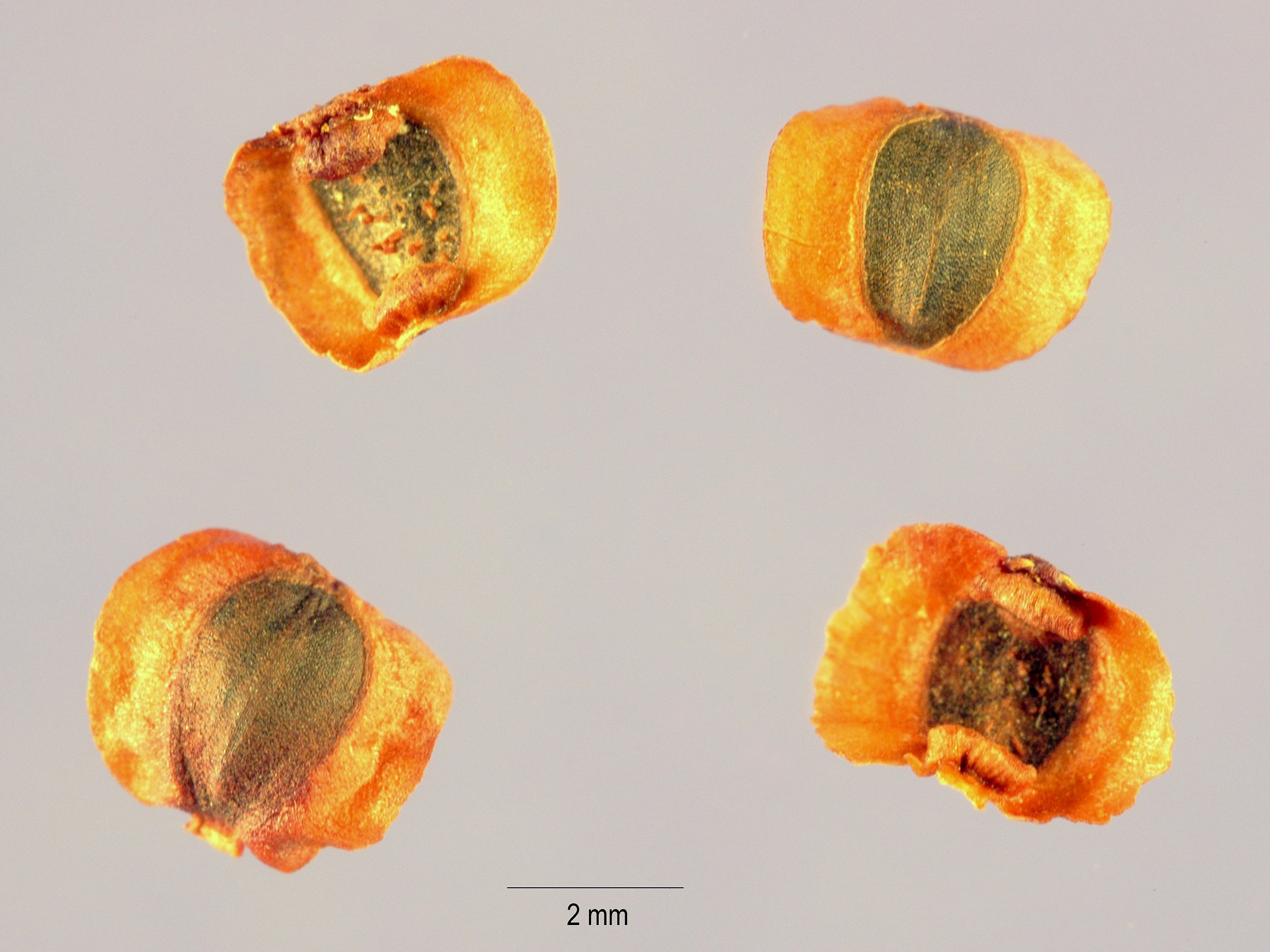
Achenes

== Etymology ==
The genus name Coreopsis means "bug-like"; it comes from the Greek words "koris", meaning "bug" and "opsis", meaning "like". The genus name, as well as the common name, tickseed, comes from the fact that the seeds are small and resemble ticks. The specific epithet lanceolata refers to the shape of the leaves.

== Distribution and habitat ==
It is native to the eastern and central parts of the United States and naturalized in Canada, the western United States, Mesoamerica, South America, South Africa and eastern Australia. Under natural conditions, it is found in open woodlands, prairies, plains, glades, meadows, and savannas.

== As an invasive plant outside of USA ==
Introduced to Japan and China as an ornamental species and later used extensively in greenification projects, particularly along river banks and railways, Coreopsis lanceolata is now known to be outcompeting native plant life and has since 2006 been labeled an invasive species by the Invasive Alien Species Act. The cultivation, transplantation, sale, or purchase of Coreopsis lanceolata is now prohibited and the plant has become the subject of a nationwide destruction campaign, even earning a spot on the Ecological Society of Japan's 100 Worst Invasive Species list. The species is also considered an invasive weed in Eastern Australia.

== Ecology ==
Flowers bloom April to June. Many insects are attracted to the plant's nectar and pollen, including bees, wasps, butterflies, moths, flies, and beetles. Birds and small mammals eat the achenes. The plant can spread to form colonies.

== Cultivation ==
Coreopsis lanceolata is useful for pollinator restoration in large urban cities, providing a food source for animals that drink the nectar and/or eat the seed. The plant should not be over watered as it will flop over. It may be restricted by growing in containers or in lawns that tend to be mowed. It requires little maintenance, although deadheading is beneficial.

It prefers a sandy, well-drained soil. Heavy, clay-based soil retains moisture in winter months, which can kill many species. However, because C. lanceolata is rhizomatous (having underground stems), it is well-adapted to withstand extremes in soil moisture (both wet and dry). Adding compost to heavy soil can improve drainage as can creating a mounded bed, allowing the planting area to shed rain faster than the ground around it. It thrives in full sun (4–6 hours of direct sunlight per day).
