= Mount Hebo =

Mountain in Oregon, United States

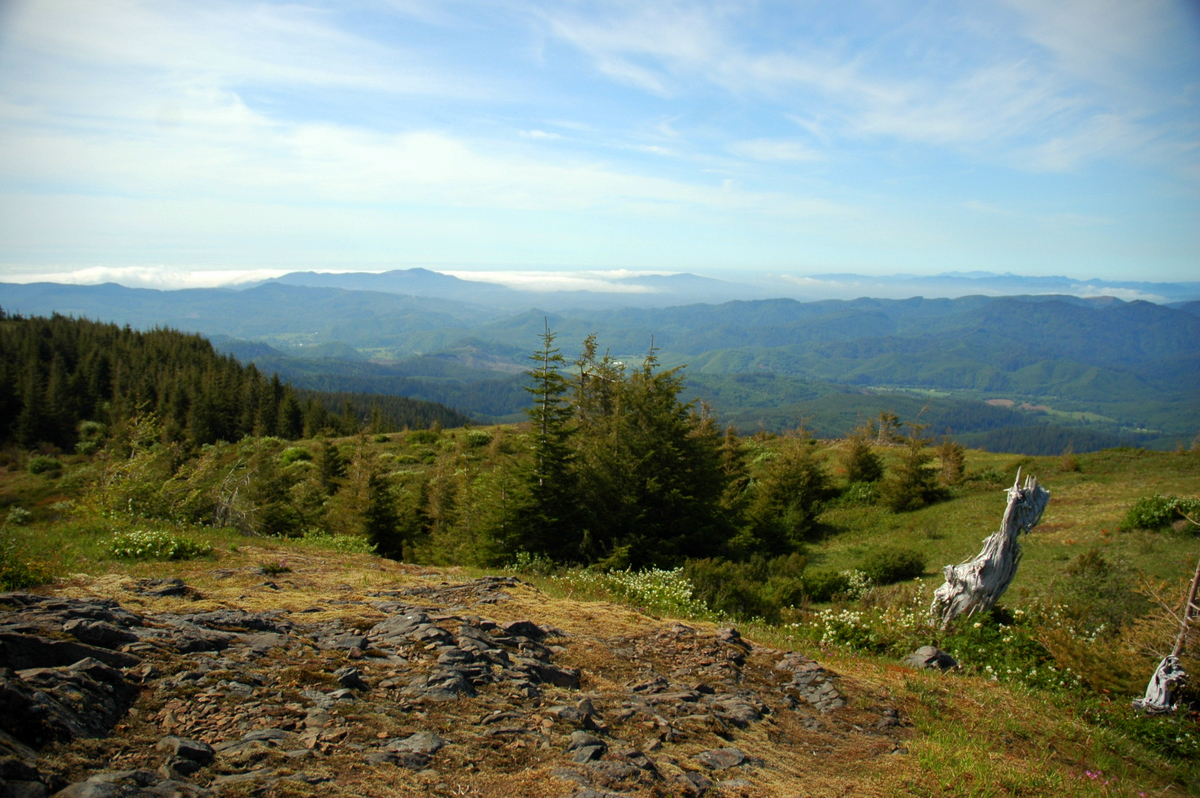
- View from Mount Hebo

Highest point
- Elevation: 3,157 ft (962 m) NAVD 88
- Coordinates: 45°12′52″N 123°45′23″W

Geography
- Location within Oregon
- Location: Yamhill / Tillamook counties, Oregon, U.S.
- Parent range: Northern Oregon Coast Range, Oregon Coast Range
- Topo map: USGS Hebo

Geology
- Mountain type: Volcano (extinct)
- Volcanic arc: Oregon Coast Range?
- Last eruption: Unknown

Mount Hebo is a mountain located on the border of Tillamook County and Yamhill County in the U.S. state of Oregon. Mount Hebo is known for being one of the best, most easily accessed viewpoints in the north Oregon Coast, with a 360-degree view from the summit.

Mount Hebo is part of the Northern Oregon Coast Range and is located in the Siuslaw National Forest overlooking the Pacific Ocean. Access to the summit is provided by an eight-mile forest service road that begins about a quarter mile from the junction of U.S. Route 101 and Oregon Route 22 in the community of Hebo.

Mount Hebo was apparently named by a viewing party seeking a new route to the Willamette Valley that climbed the mountain to get a better view of the terrain. A member of the party said the mountain should be called "Heave Ho" because from their position it looked like it had been heaved up from its surroundings. The name became distorted over the years to its present form.

Mount Hebo was the site of the Mount Hebo Air Force Station, a long-range radar installation, 1956–1980.

== Geology ==
Mount Hebo is a dead volcano, which is another name for an extinct volcano. Mount Hebo was either a seamount or an on-land volcano that was part of the Oregon Coast Range.
