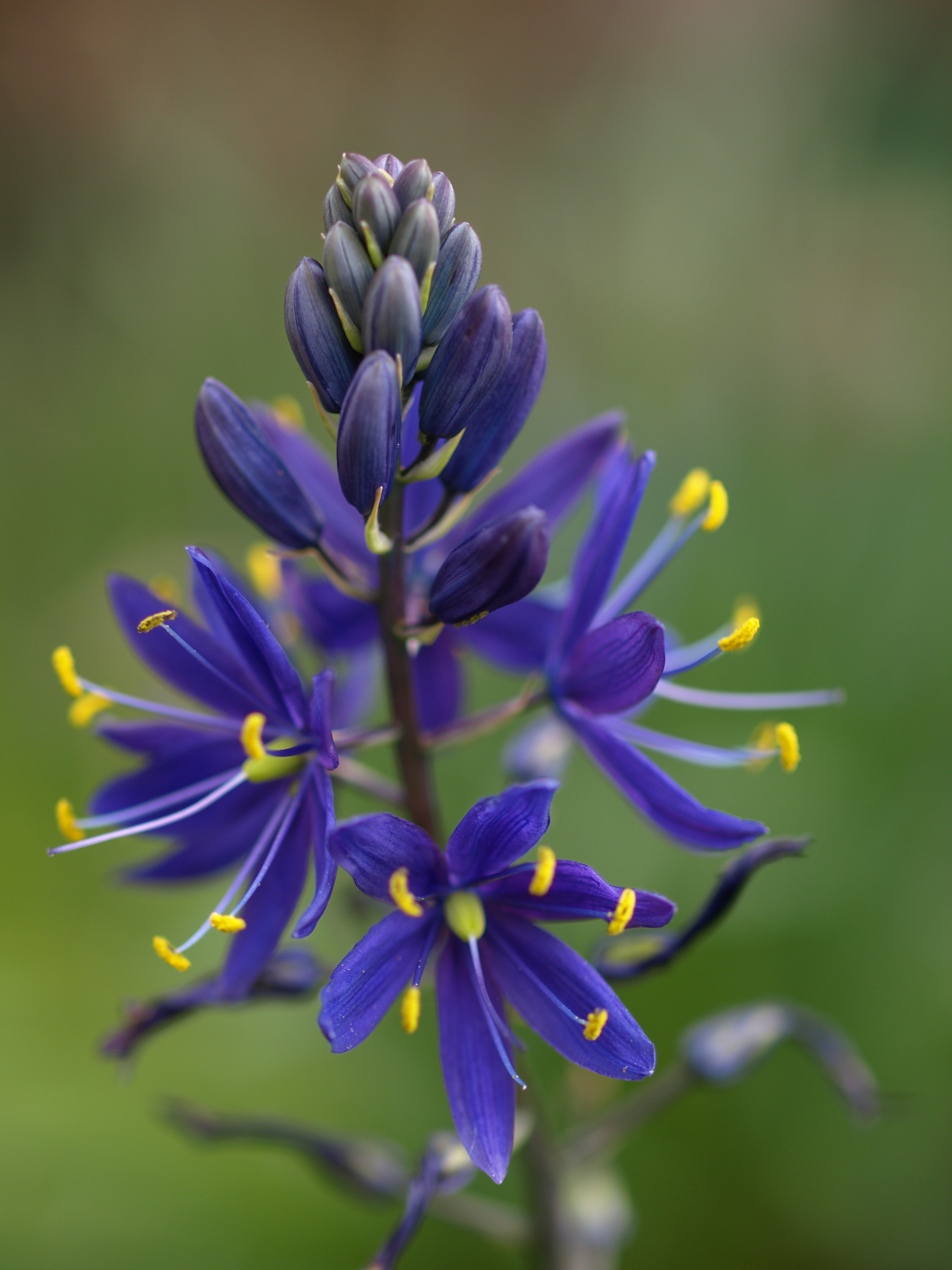
- Great camas inflorescence

Conservation status
- Apparently Secure (NatureServe)

Scientific classification
- Kingdom: Plantae
- Clade: Tracheophytes
- Clade: Angiosperms
- Clade: Monocots
- Order: Asparagales
- Family: Asparagaceae
- Subfamily: Agavoideae
- Genus: Camassia
- Species: C. leichtlinii

Binomial name
- Camassia leichtlinii (Baker) S.Watson

Synonyms
- Camassia esculenta var. leichtlinii Baker; Camassia leichtlinii subsp. typica Gould; Quamasia leichtlinii (Baker) Coville

= Camassia leichtlinii =

Species of plant

Camassia leichtlinii, the great camas or large camas, is a species of flowering plant in the family Asparagaceae. This herbaceous perennial is native to western North America in British Columbia, Canada and California, Nevada, Oregon and Washington, in the United States.

== Description ==
Great camas is a perennial herbaceous plant that grows from a bulb. It can grow 24–48 inches (61–122 cm) tall. Leaves are long and narrow, stemming from the basal rosette. The inflorescence is a spike-like cluster on a leafless stem that is held above the leaves. It can be mistaken for the more common Camassia quamash, which has an overlapping range.

== Ecology ==
It needs consistent moisture in the spring, but will not be harmed by seasonal drought once the seed capsules have matured and the leaves dried out. Camas stands can benefit from seasonal fires as well, as they aid in regeneration and reduce competition from brush and weeds.

== Uses ==
The bulbs are edible, but must be baked at length. Traditionally, they were cooked in fire pits for at least three hours, and ideally for between one and three days. Caution should be taken not to confuse this species with the deadly meadow death-camas.
