= Camassia angusta =

Scientific classification
- Kingdom: Plantae
- Clade: Tracheophytes
- Clade: Angiosperms
- Clade: Monocots
- Order: Asparagales
- Family: Asparagaceae
- Subfamily: Agavoideae
- Genus: Camassia
- Species: C. angusta

Binomial name
- Camassia angusta (Engelm. & A.Gray) Blank.

Synonyms
- Camassia alba Anon.; Camassia fraseri var. angusta (Engelm. & A.Gray) Torr. & A.Gray; Quamasia angusta (Engelm. & A.Gray) Piper; Scilla angusta Engelm. & A.Gray

Species of plant

Camassia angusta, the prairie camas or prairie hyacinth, is a species of flowering plant in the family Asparagaceae. It is native to the central US; Kansas, Oklahoma, Texas, Iowa, Missouri, Arkansas, Illinois, and Indiana. A bulbous perennial reaching 75 cm (30 in), it blooms in April and May with white, blue, purple, or violet flowers.
