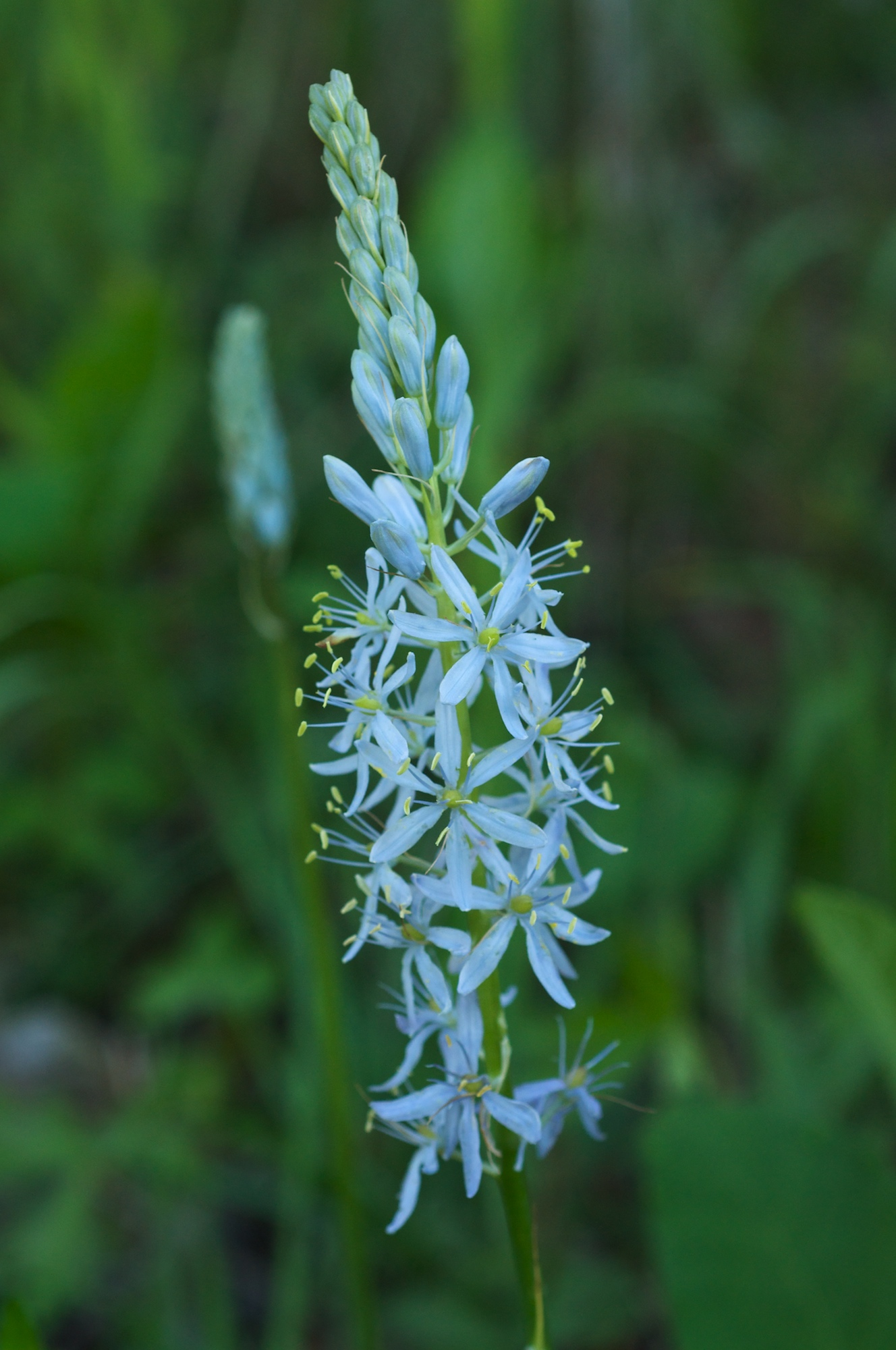

Conservation status
- Secure (NatureServe)

Scientific classification
- Kingdom: Plantae
- Clade: Tracheophytes
- Clade: Angiosperms
- Clade: Monocots
- Order: Asparagales
- Family: Asparagaceae
- Subfamily: Agavoideae
- Genus: Camassia
- Species: C. scilloides

Binomial name
- Camassia scilloides (Raf.) Cory.

Synonyms
- Camassia esculenta (Ker Gawl.) B.L.Rob.(nom. illeg.)

= Camassia scilloides =

Species of flowering plant

Camassia scilloides is a perennial herb known commonly as Atlantic camas, wild hyacinth, and eastern camas. It is native to the eastern half of North America, including Ontario and the eastern United States.

== Description ==
The species produces inflorescences up to half a meter tall from a bulb 1–3 centimetres (0.39–1.18 in) wide. It has a few leaves, each up to 20–60 cm (7.9–23.6 in) long. The flowers have light blue or whitish tepals and yellow anthers. The green or brown capsule is up to a centimeter long and divided into three parts.

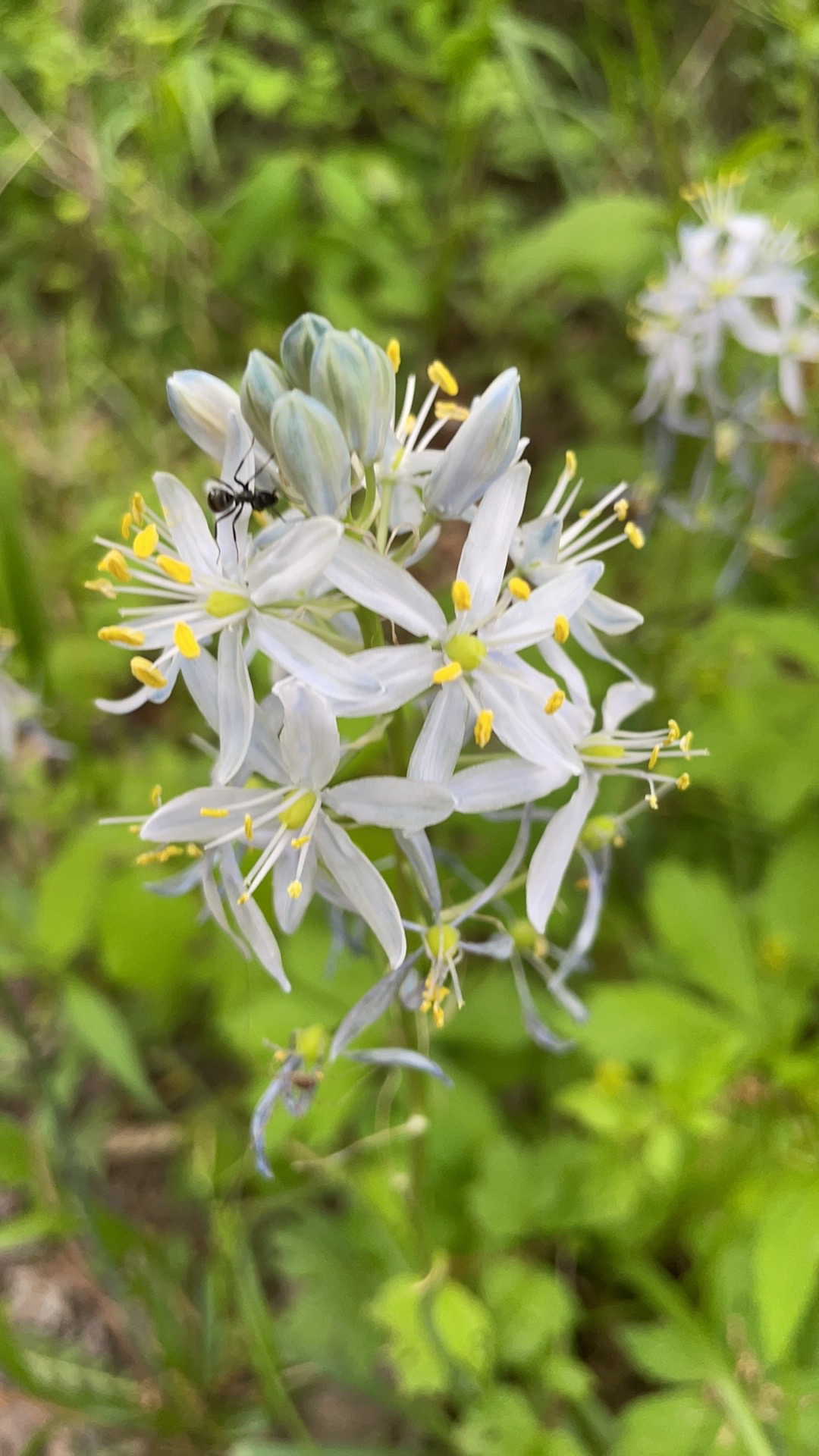
Atlantic camas ("wild hyacinth") flower

== Uses ==
Native American groups used the bulbs for food, eating them raw, baked, roasted, boiled, or dried. They can be used in place of potatoes, but could possibly be confused for poisonous deathcamas.

== Taxonomy ==
The superseded name Camassia esculenta (Ker Gawl.) B.L.Rob. (nom. illeg.) should not be confused with Camassia esculenta (Nutt.) Lindl., a superseded name for Camassia quamash subsp. quamash.
