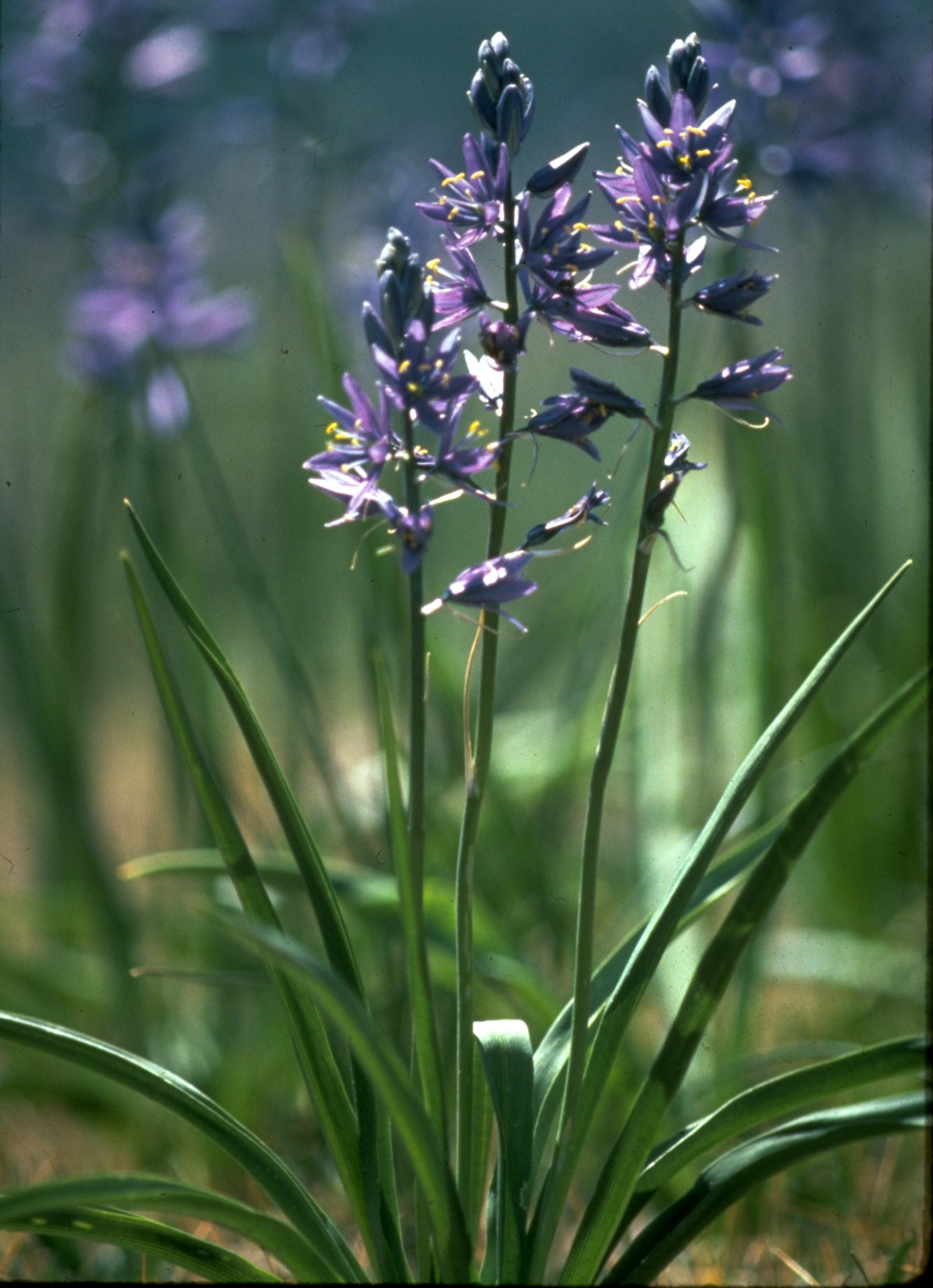

Conservation status
- Secure (NatureServe)

Scientific classification
- Kingdom: Plantae
- Clade: Tracheophytes
- Clade: Angiosperms
- Clade: Monocots
- Order: Asparagales
- Family: Asparagaceae
- Subfamily: Agavoideae
- Genus: Camassia
- Species: C. quamash

Binomial name
- Camassia quamash (Pursh) Greene

Synonyms
- List: Anthericum quamash (Pursh) Steud. (1821); Camassia leichtlinii var. watsonii M.E.Jones (1912); Phalangium quamash Pursh (1813); Quamasia quamash (Pursh) Coville (1898)

= Camassia quamash =

Common camas

Plant species in the asparagus family

Camassia quamash, commonly known as camas, kwetlal, small camas, common camas, common camash or quamash, is a perennial herb. It is native to western North America in large areas of southern Canada and the northwestern United States.

== Description ==
Camassia quamash is a perennial plant with a herbaceous character that has a wide range of variation across its geographical range. It is a monocot that has grasslike leaves, as typical of that group, that emerge from a persistent bulb. The bulb is of moderate size, 1 to 5 centimeters (1/2 to 2 in) in diameter. The bulbs do not frequently cluster together and their surface is black while the interior is white with layers like that of an onion.

The leaves very rarely number more than nine on a plant and range in length from 10 to 60 cm (4 to 24 in). In comparison to their length they are quite narrow, 4 to 20 millimetres (0.16 to 0.79 in) in width. The upper surface of the leaves may or may not have a pale, waxy coating depending on the variety. All the leaves spring from the base of the plant and the sturdy stem is leafless.

The flowering stems in wild or cultivated plants can be up to 80 centimeters (2.6 ft), but may be as short as 20 cm (8 in). As the inflorescence does not have branches it is a raceme.

The pale blue to deep blue flowers appear in late spring to early summer (May to June in their native habitat). Each of the radially symmetrical, star-shaped flowers has six tepals, about 2.5 cm (1 in) across, and six stamens.

The leaves and bulbs of the plant are similar to the toxic white-flowered meadow death-camas, a plant that is not in Camassia, but part of the death-camas genus (Toxicoscordion) and grows in the same areas.

== Taxonomy ==
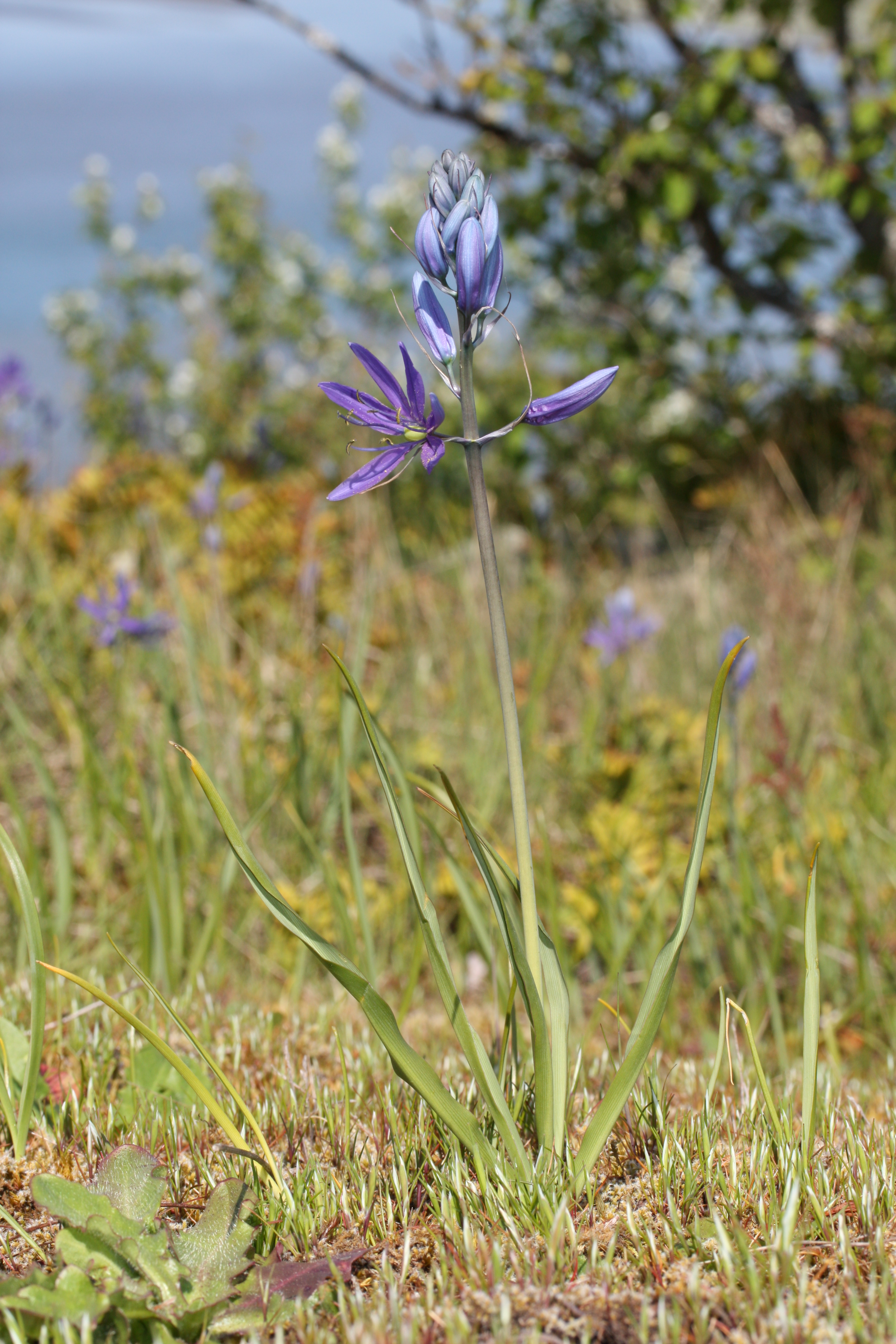
C. quamash subsp. maxima

There are eight subspecies;

- Camassia quamash subsp. azurea – small camas
- Camassia quamash subsp. breviflora – small camas
- Camassia quamash subsp. intermedia – small camas
- Camassia quamash subsp. linearis – small camas
- Camassia quamash subsp. maxima – small camas
- Camassia quamash subsp. quamash – common camas
- Camassia quamash subsp. utahensis – Utah small camas
- Camassia quamash subsp. walpolei – Walpole's small camas

=== Synonyms ===
The superseded name for Camassia quamash subsp. quamash, Camassia esculenta (Nutt.) Lindl., should not be confused with the superseded name Camassia esculenta (Ker Gawl.) B.L.Rob., (nom. illeg.) for Camassia scilloides.

=== Etymology ===
The genus name comes from the Nez Perce Indian name for this plant, and means "sweet". Qém'es, a term for the plant's bulb, which was gathered and used as a food source by tribes in the Pacific Northwest, and were an important food source for the Lewis and Clark Expedition (1804–1806). The bulbs are or were harvested and pit-roasted or boiled by women of the Nez Perce, Cree, and Blackfoot tribes.

== Distribution and habitat ==
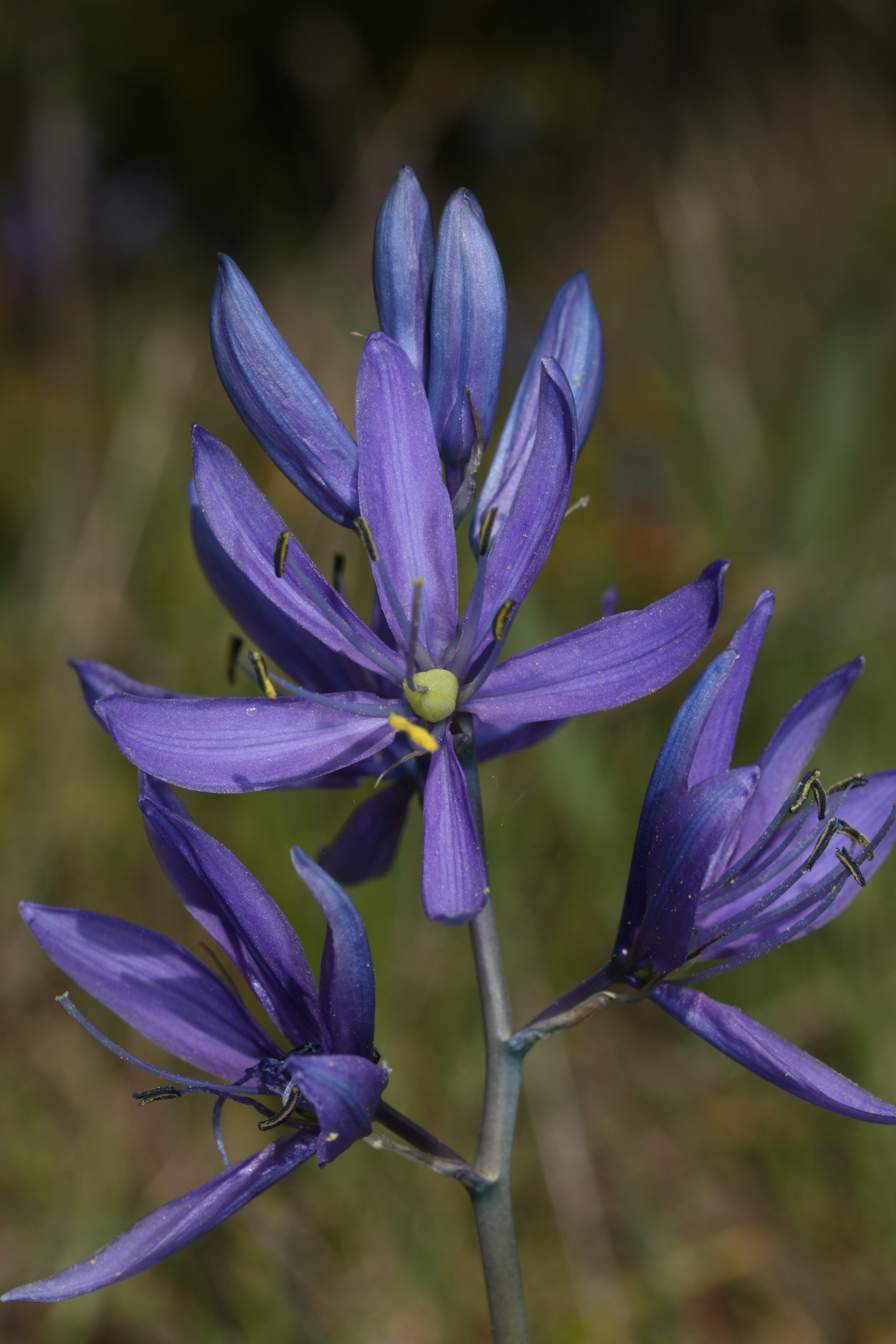
C. quamash subsp. maxima, Skagit County, Washington

The species is native to western North America in large areas of southern Canada and the northwestern United States, from British Columbia and Alberta to California and east from Washington state to Montana and Wyoming.

Though the once-immense spreads of camas lands have diminished because of modern developments and agriculture, numerous camas prairies and marshes may still be seen today. In the Great Basin, expanded settlement by whites accompanied by turning cattle and hogs onto camas prairies greatly diminished food available to native tribes and increased tension between Native Americans and settlers and travelers. Both the Bannock and Nez Perce Wars began after Nez Perce became incensed at the failure of the US government to uphold treaties, and at settlers who plowed up their camas prairies, which they depended on for subsistence.

== Cultivation ==
This bulb flower naturalizes well in gardens. The bulb grows best in well-drained soil high in humus. It will grow in lightly shaded forest areas and on rocky outcrops as well as in open meadows or prairies. Additionally, it is found growing alongside streams and rivers. The plants may be divided in autumn after the leaves have withered. Additionally, the plant spreads by seed rather than by runners.

In the Pacific Northwest, Lekwungen peoples and others have cultivated kwetlal bulbs since precolonial times. Kwetlal has been promoted as a good replacement for invasive species for environmental and cultural restoration.

== Uses ==
Camas is grown as an ornamental plant. Even in the wild, large numbers of camas can color an entire meadow blue-violet.

=== Food ===
The bulbs of this Camassia species are edible and nutritious when roasted or boiled, but are easily confused with those of the deathcamas. Though the white deathcamas flowers are very different, the bulbs are difficult to distinguish.

Camas has been a food source for many native peoples in the western United States and Canada. After being harvested in the autumn, once the flowers have withered, the bulbs are pit-roasted or boiled. The latter produced a syrup. A pit-cooked camas bulb looks and tastes something like baked sweet potato, but sweeter, and with more crystalline fibers due to the presence of inulin in the bulbs—an oligosaccharide responsible for the copious flatulence caused by excessive consumption of undercooked bulbs. Bulbs can also be dried and pounded into flour, which can be used for baking or as a thickener. Native American tribes who have eaten camas include the Nez Perce, Cree, Coast Salish, Lummi, and Blackfoot tribes, among many others. Camas bulbs contributed to the survival of members of the Lewis and Clark Expedition (1804–06).

Camas bulbs (and bannock made from them) are listed in the Ark of Taste.

== Gallery ==
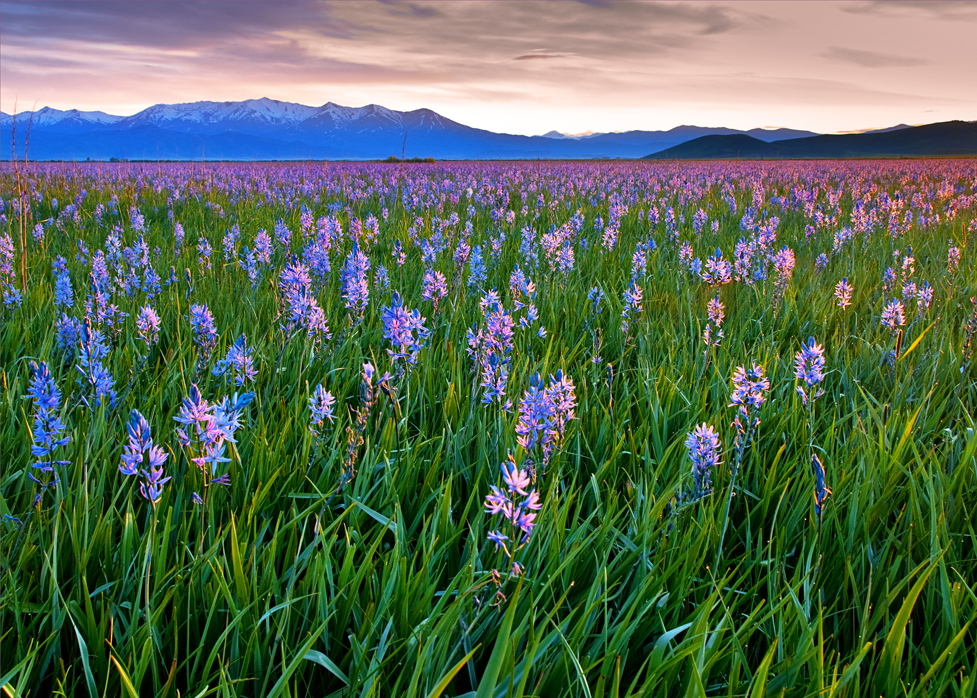
Sunrise at Camas Prairie Centennial Park

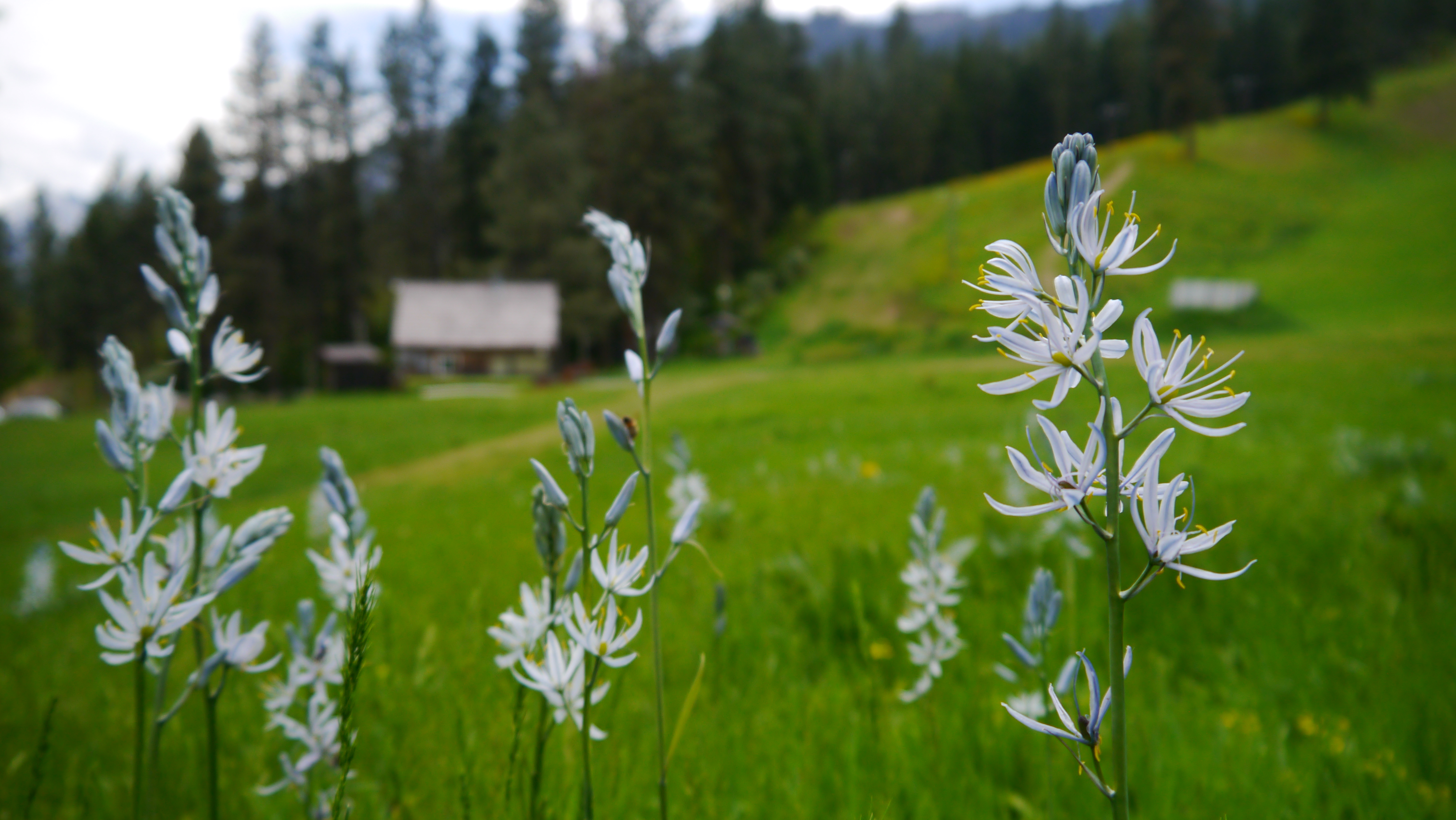
C. quamash ssp. quamash

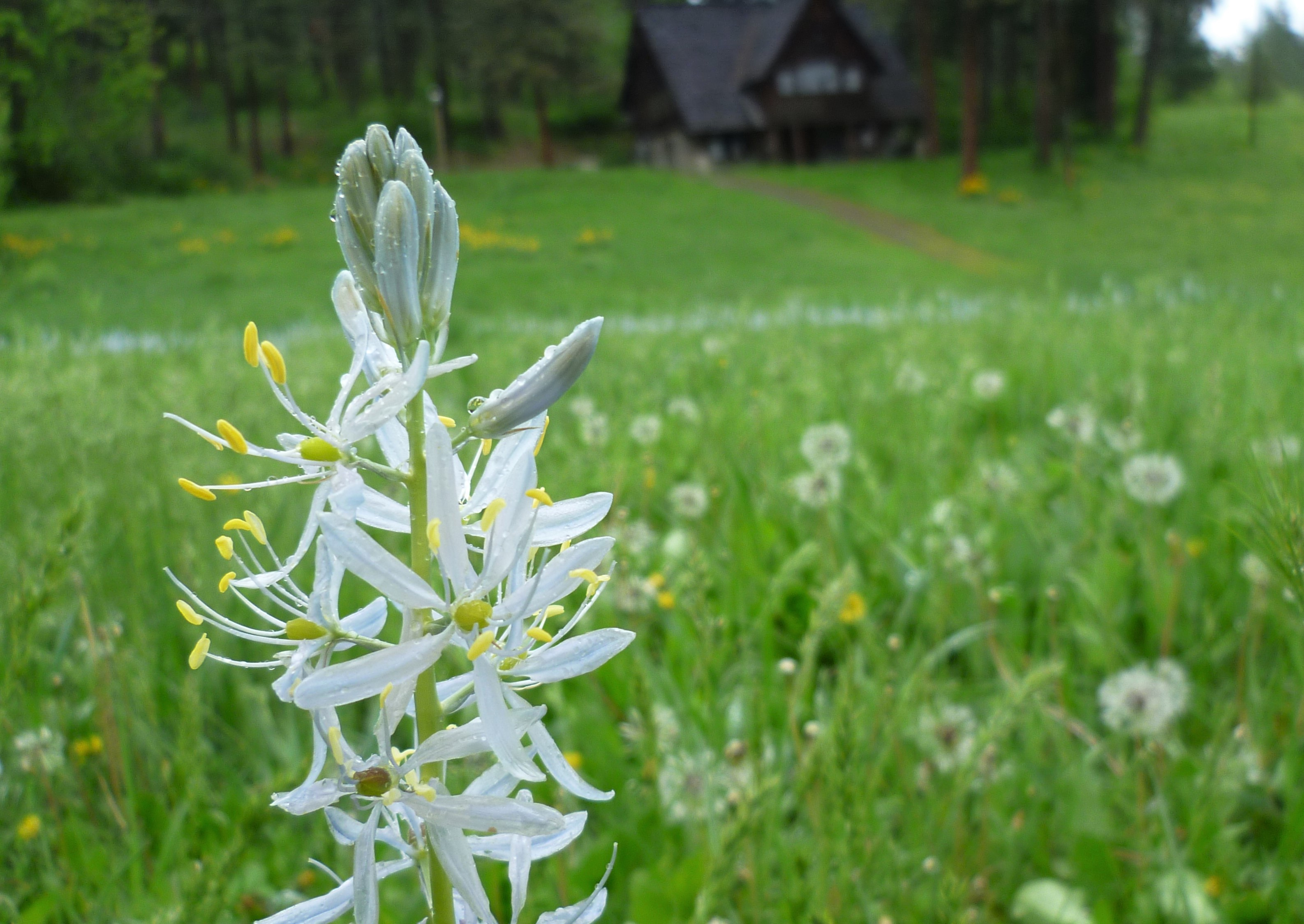
C. quamash at Leavenworth Ski Hill, Chelan County, Washington

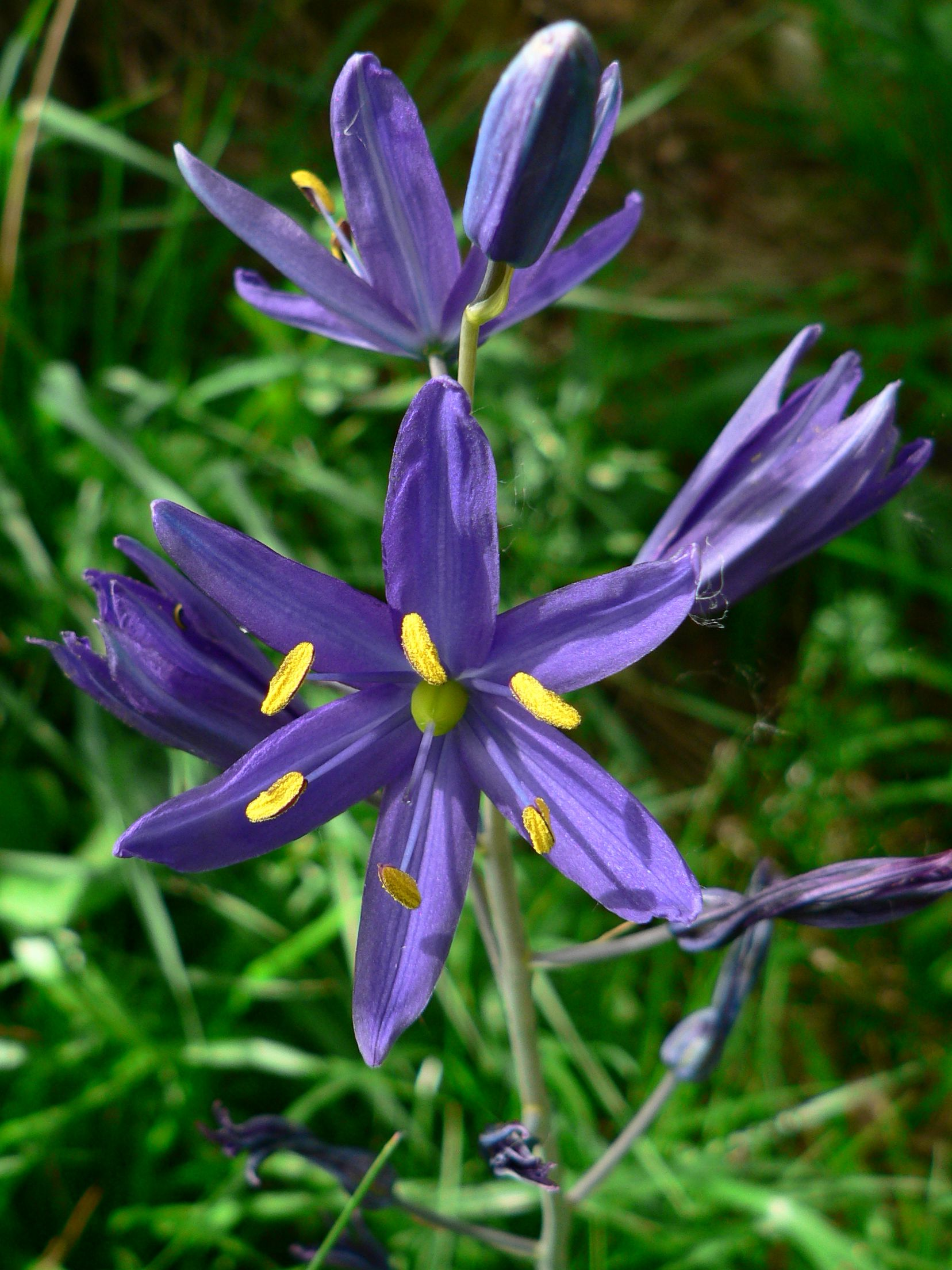
Flowers in Corvallis, Oregon

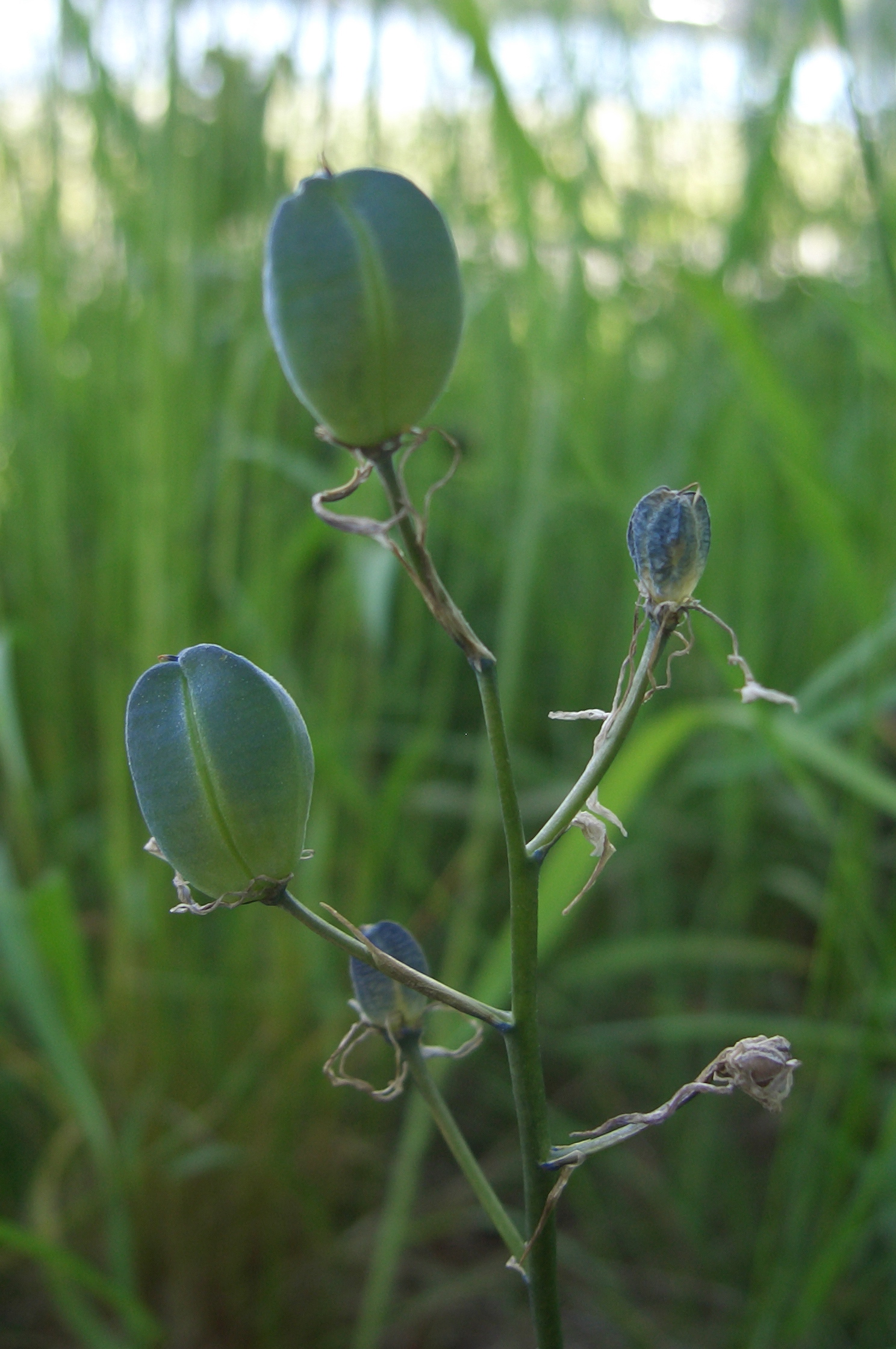
Fruits

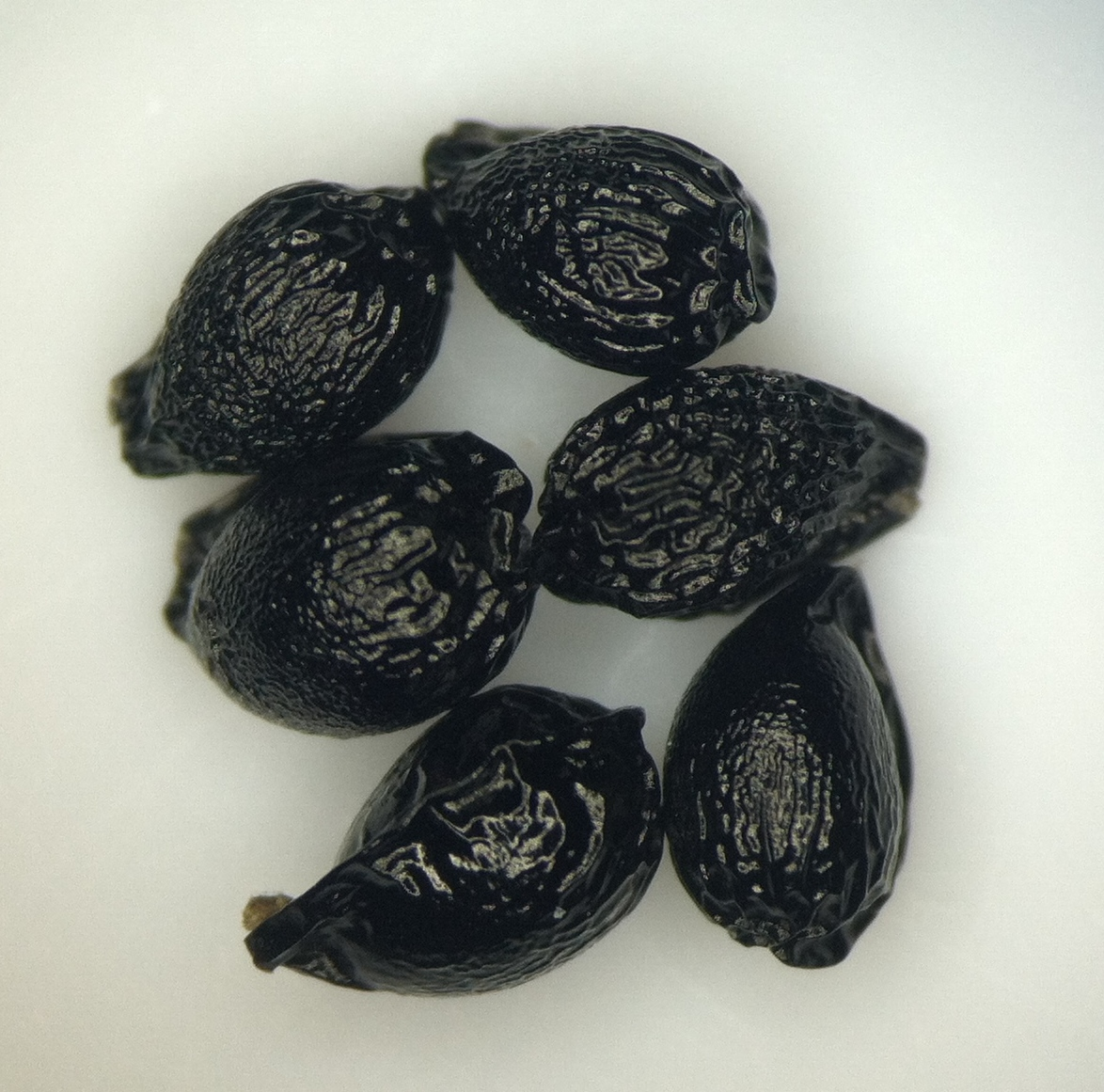
Seeds
