= Deathcamas =

Deathcamas or death camas refer to several species of flowering plant in the tribe Melanthieae. The name alludes to the great similarity of appearance between these toxic plants, which were formerly classified together in the genus Zigadenus, and the edible camases (Camassia), with which they also often share habitat. Other common names for these plants include deadly zigadene, hog potato and mystery-grass.

== Subspecies ==
- Anticlea elegans – Mountain deathcamas
- Anticlea mogollonensis – Mogollon deathcamas
- Anticlea vaginata – Sheathed deathcamas
- Anticlea virescens – Green deathcamas
- Anticlea volcanica – Lava deathcamas
- Stenanthium densum – Pinebarren deathcamas
- Toxicoscordion brevibracteatum – Desert deathcamas
- Toxicoscordion exaltatum – Giant deathcamas
- Toxicoscordion fontanum – Smallflower deathcamas
- Toxicoscordion fremontii – Fremont's deathcamas, star zigadene - (several varieties)
- Toxicoscordion micranthum – Smallflower deathcamas
- Toxicoscordion nuttallii – Nuttall's deathcamas
- Toxicoscordion paniculatum – Foothill deathcamas
- Toxicoscordion venenosum – Death camas, meadow deathcamas - (several varieties)
- Zigadenus glaberrimus, Sandbog deathcamas
