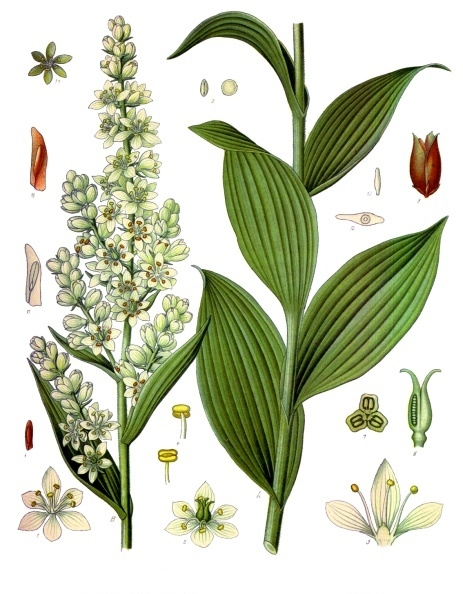
- Veratrum album

Scientific classification
- Kingdom: Plantae
- Clade: Tracheophytes
- Clade: Angiosperms
- Clade: Monocots
- Order: Liliales
- Family: Melanthiaceae
- Tribe: Melanthieae

Synonyms
- Veratreae T.Nees & C.H.Eberm. ex Endl.

= Melanthieae =

Tribe of flowering plants

Melanthieae is a tribe of flowering plants within the family Melanthiaceae. Molecular phylogenetic studies in the 21st century have resulted in a large-scale reassignment of many of its species to different genera; in particular the genus Zigadenus (deathcamases) has been restricted to a single species, Zigadenus glaberrimus. Members of this tribe produce alkaloids that are toxic to both animals and humans.

== Description ==
Like the family as a whole, members of the tribe are "lilioid monocots", i.e. their flowers superficially resemble those of the genus Lilium, with six tepals not differentiated into sepals and petals. As with other lilioid monocots, they were previously included in a broadly defined family Liliaceae. They are found mainly in woodland or alpine habitats in the temperate regions of the Northern Hemisphere (North America, Central America, and Asia), with one species found in South America. They are perennials, growing from a bulb or rhizome (or both). Plants have relatively long leaves, both at the base of the plant and along the flowering stems; many have off-white flowers, tending towards green or purple.

The tribe has some distinctive features within the family Melanthiaceae, including nectaries on the tepals (whose number and position is a useful identifying character for some genera); the unusual way in which the anthers open (dehisce) to release pollen; and the possession of a particular class of alkaloids (veratrum alkaloids). Because of these alkaloids, all members of the tribe are at least unpalatable to livestock, and some are seriously toxic to both animals and humans. Many species have common names including the words "death camas", because of their toxicity and their superficial similarity to the unrelated genus Camassia, species of which are known as "camas".

== Taxonomy and phylogeny ==
The species making up the tribe Melanthieae have been considered to form a "natural group" for a long time; the name "Melanthieae" was first used by August Grisebach in 1846. Other names which have been used with more or less the same circumscription include Veratreae and Melanthiaceae sensu stricto.

The main genera included in the tribe before the start of the 21st century were Schoenocaulon, Stenanthium, Veratrum, Melanthium (often included in Veratrum) and Zigadenus s.l. The last genus contained about 20 species when broadly defined and lacked very distinctive morphological features. Various genera were constructed between 1837 and 1903 to divide up Zigadenus, including Amianthium (Gray, 1837), Anticlea (Kunth, 1843) and Toxicoscordion (Rydberg, 1903). Only the first of these gained broad acceptance in the 20th century (e.g. the Flora of North America recognizes only Amianthium and Zigadenus). A study in 2001 based on both nuclear and plastid gene sequences led to the conclusion that the broadly defined Zigadenus was polyphyletic; in particular the genera Schoenocaulon and Veratrum-Melanthium were nested inside it. Monophyletic groups could be produced by splitting Zigadenus into five genera (assuming Amianthium to have been included): Amianthium, Anticlea, Stenanthium, and Toxicoscordion, leaving only Zigadenus glaberrimus in Zigadenus. Although the reorganization was done primarily on the basis of molecular grounds, it is supported by morphological and distributional considerations. The cladogram below shows phylogenetic relationships in the Tribe Melanthieae; shaded names represent nodes which contain species formerly placed in the broadly defined Zigadenus.

- Tribe Melanthieae
  - Zigadenus s.s.
  - - Schoenocaulon
    - - Toxicoscordion
      - - - Anticlea (including some Stenanthium species)
          - Stenanthium
        - - Veratrum s.l. (i.e. including Melanthium)
          - Amianthium

The distributions and some key features of the genera into which Zigadenus is divided are:

- Zigadenus (south-east US): rhizome (no bulb), 2 conspicuous glands per tepal.
- Amianthium (south-east US): ovoid bulb, seeds with red to purple sarcotesta.
- Stenanthium (south-east US): slender cylindrical bulb, seeds brown with no sarcotesta.
- Toxicoscordion (mid-western US and western North America): tepals with claws and 1 conspicuous rounded gland.
- Anticlea (Asia, North and Central America as far south as Guatemala): narrow tepals with 1 conspicuous bilobed gland.

=== Species transferred to other genera ===
Around twenty species were included in the genus Zigadenus as it was previously circumscribed. Zigadenus glaberrimus, sandbog deathcamas, is the only species remaining. Zigadenus species which have been transferred to other genera are listed below under their new name.

- Amianthium muscitotoxum - Flypoison

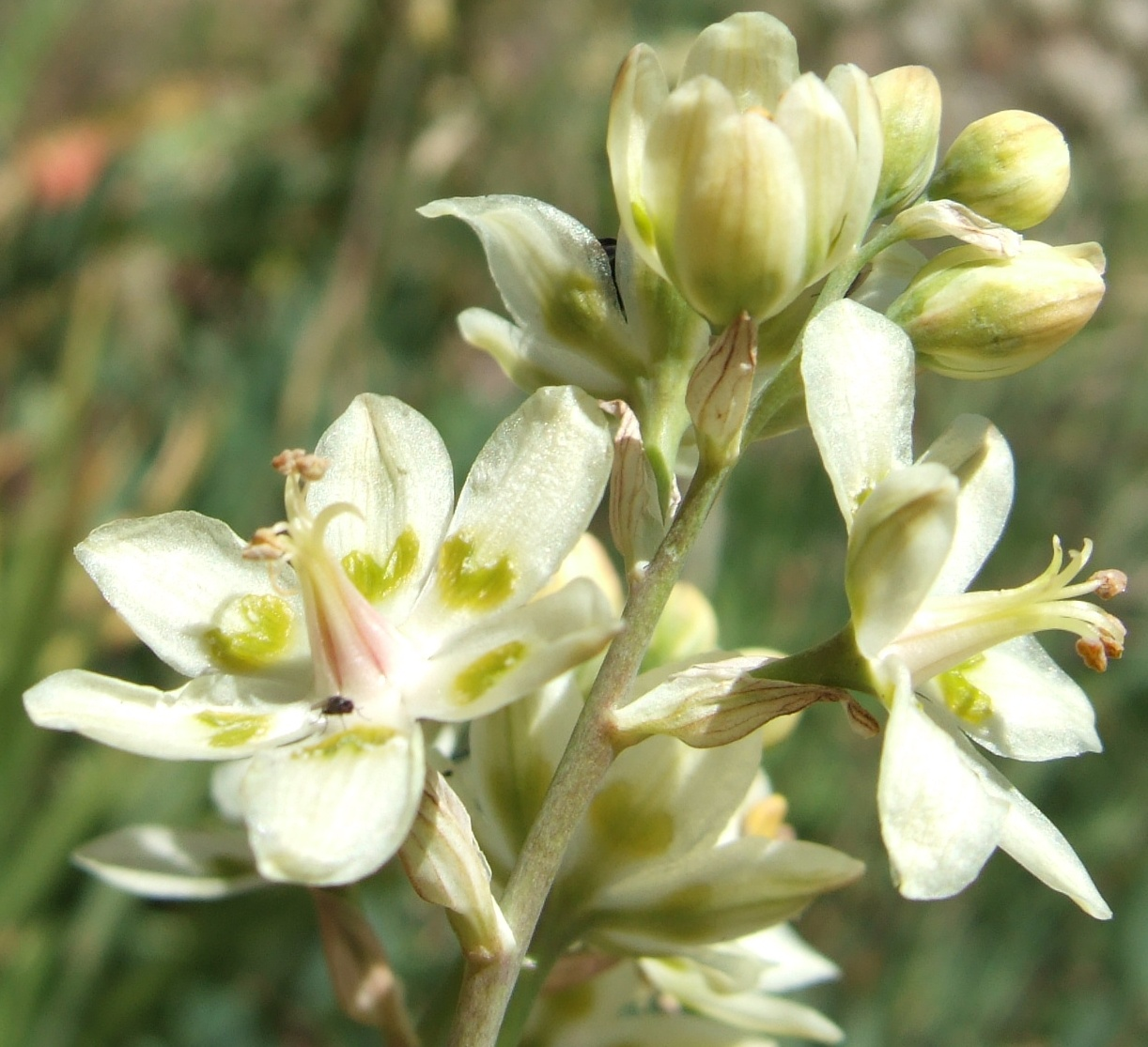
Anticlea elegans

- Anticlea elegans - Elegant camas, alkali grass, mountain deathcamas
- Anticlea hintoniorum
- Anticlea mogollonensis - Mogollon deathcamas
- Anticlea neglecta
- Anticlea sibirica
- Anticlea vaginata - Sheathed deathcamas
- Anticlea virescens - Green deathcamas
- Anticlea volcanica - Lava deathcamas

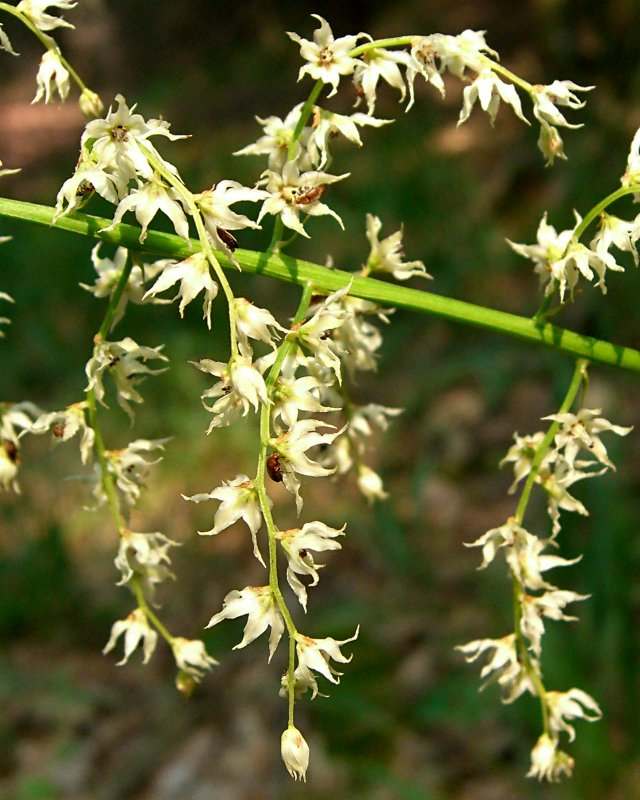
Stenanthium gramineum

- Stenanthium densum (plus Stenanthium leimanthoides for those sources regarding this as a distinct species) - Osceola's Plume, Black Snakeroot, Crow Poison, Pinebarren Deathcamas
- Stenanthium gramineum - Featherbells
- Toxicoscordion brevibracteatum - Desert deathcamas
- Toxicoscordion exaltatum - Giant deathcamas
- Toxicoscordion fontanum – Smallflower deathcamas
- Toxicoscordion fremontii - Fremont's deathcamas, star zigadene - (several varieties)
- Toxicoscordion nuttallii - Nuttall's deathcamas
- Toxicoscordion paniculatum - Foothill deathcamas, sand-corn
- Toxicoscordion venenosum - Deathcamas, meadow deathcamas - (several varieties)
- Toxicoscordion micranthum - Smallflower deathcamas

In addition, three species have been transferred from Stenanthium to Anticlea.

- Anticlea frigida
- Anticlea occidentalis
- Anticlea sachalinensis

== Genera ==
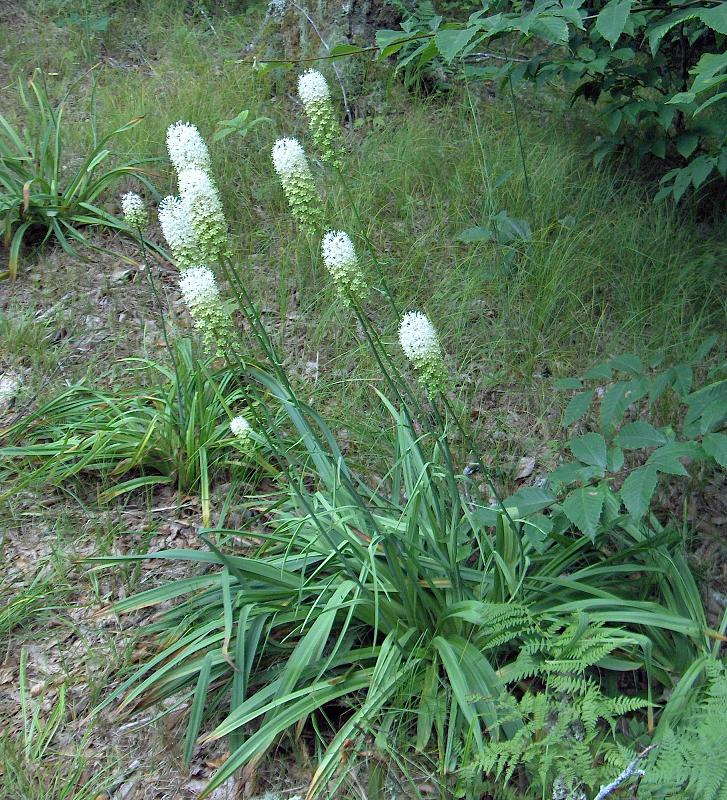
Amianthium muscitoxicum

Amianthium

Amianthium consists of a single species, A. muscitotoxum, known as flypoison. It is found in eastern North America. It grows from a bulb and has a dense oval-shaped inflorescence. Individual flowers start off white and develop red-green shades with age. All parts of the plant are poisonous; two unique alkaloids, jervine and amianthine, contribute to its toxicity.

Anticlea

As currently circumscribed, Anticlea consists of about 11 species, found in Asia, North America and Central America down to Guatemala. Anticlea elegans (the mountain deathcamas) is one of the best known. Like other species in the genus, it grows from bulbs and has flowers with relatively narrow tepals, in this case coloured white to green.

Melanthium

Melanthium is sometimes included in the closely related genus Veratrum. As of April 2012, the World Checklist of Selected Plant Families recognizes four species, found in the central and eastern United States. Their flowers differ from Veratrum by being arranged in more open and delicate-looking inflorescences and by having tepals which narrow at the base.

Schoenocaulon A.Gray

Schoenocaulon is a genus of around 25 species. The precise number is unclear; two species were only discovered in 2008, and many occur only in remote regions of Mexico, where their montane forest habitat is under threat. The centre of diversity is in Mexico. They are also found in Central America, with a few species extending into South America, and in the United States, along the eastern part of the border with Mexico and in Florida. They grow from a bulb with a fibrous coat and have a long narrow spike-like inflorescence made up of very small flowers with long protruding stamens.

Stenanthium

As of April 2012, Stenanthium consists of three or four species (depending on whether S. leimanthoides is recognized) found in the south eastern United States. Like the other species, Stenanthium gramineum (feather bells) grows from a slender bulb, and has inflorescences with a complex branching structure in which individual flowers have narrow tapering tepals.

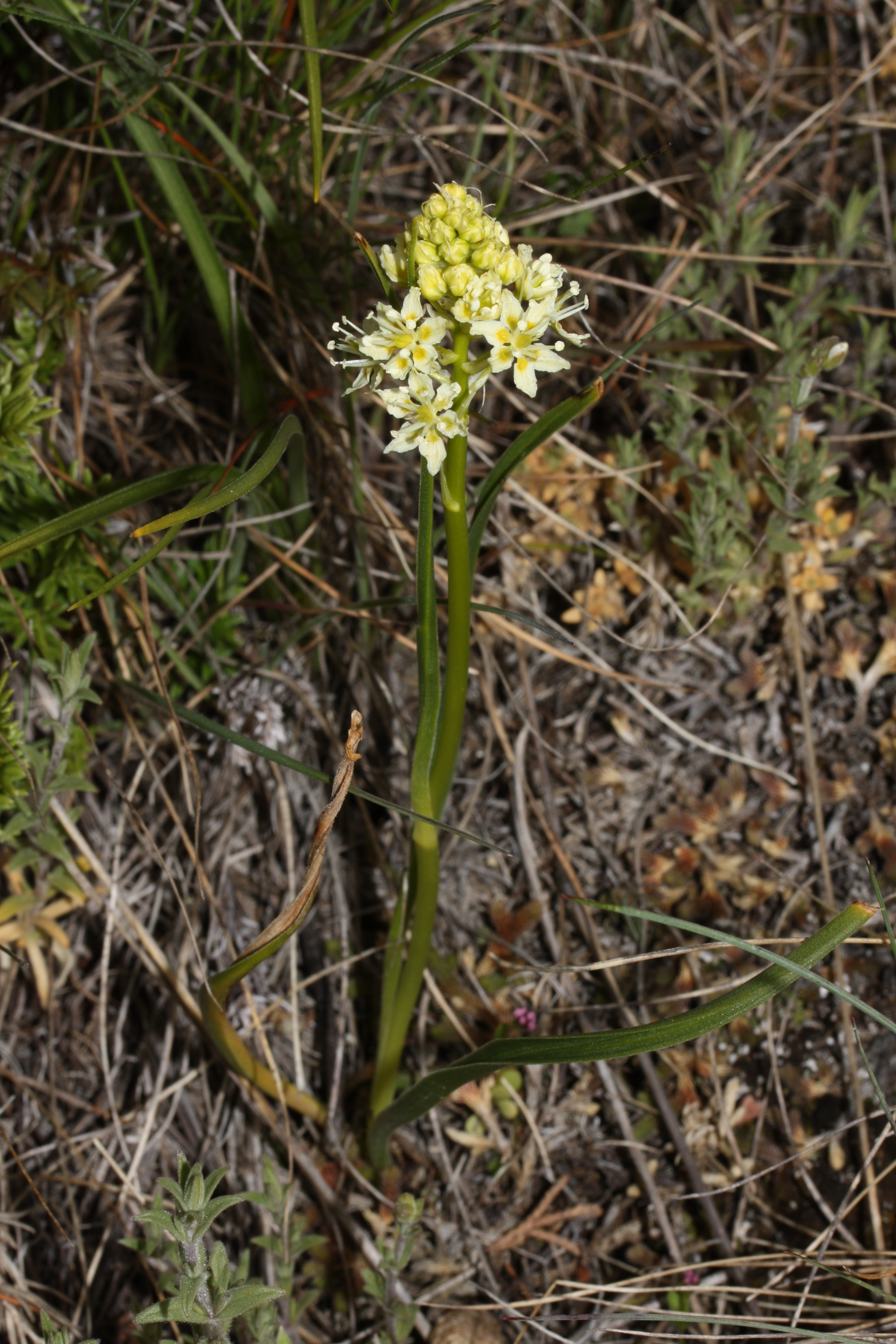
Toxicoscordion venenosum

Toxicoscordion

Eight species are included in the genus Toxicoscordion, which is found in western North America. The well-known poisonous species formerly placed in Zigadenus, the "deathcamas", are now included in Toxicoscordion. Plants grow from an ovoid bulb and have tepals which are narrowed at their bases to form a "claw". Toxicoscordion venenosum, the meadow deathcamas, is one of the more widely distributed species. Its flowers are white to cream in colour and grow in pointed clusters.

Veratrum

Veratrum is found throughout temperate regions of the Northern Hemisphere. The genus has possibly as many as 40 species, depending on how finely some of the widely distributed species are divided and whether the closely related genus Melanthium is included or not. Plants grow from a combination of short rhizomes and bulbs. They generally have quite large leaves and inflorescences in which individual flowers vary in colour from white to green, yellow or purple. They contain a variety of alkaloids which make them poisonous, although some have medical uses. Some species are cultivated for their form as well as their flowers.

Zigadenus

The genus Zigadenus now contains only a single species Z. glaberrimus, the sandbog deathcamas. Found in the south eastern United States, it grows from thick rhizomes rather than bulbs. The flowers are grouped into a loose inflorescence and are white to cream in colour.

== Bibliography ==
- Flora of North America Editorial Committee, ed. (1982), Flora of North America (online), eFlora.org
