= Zygacine =

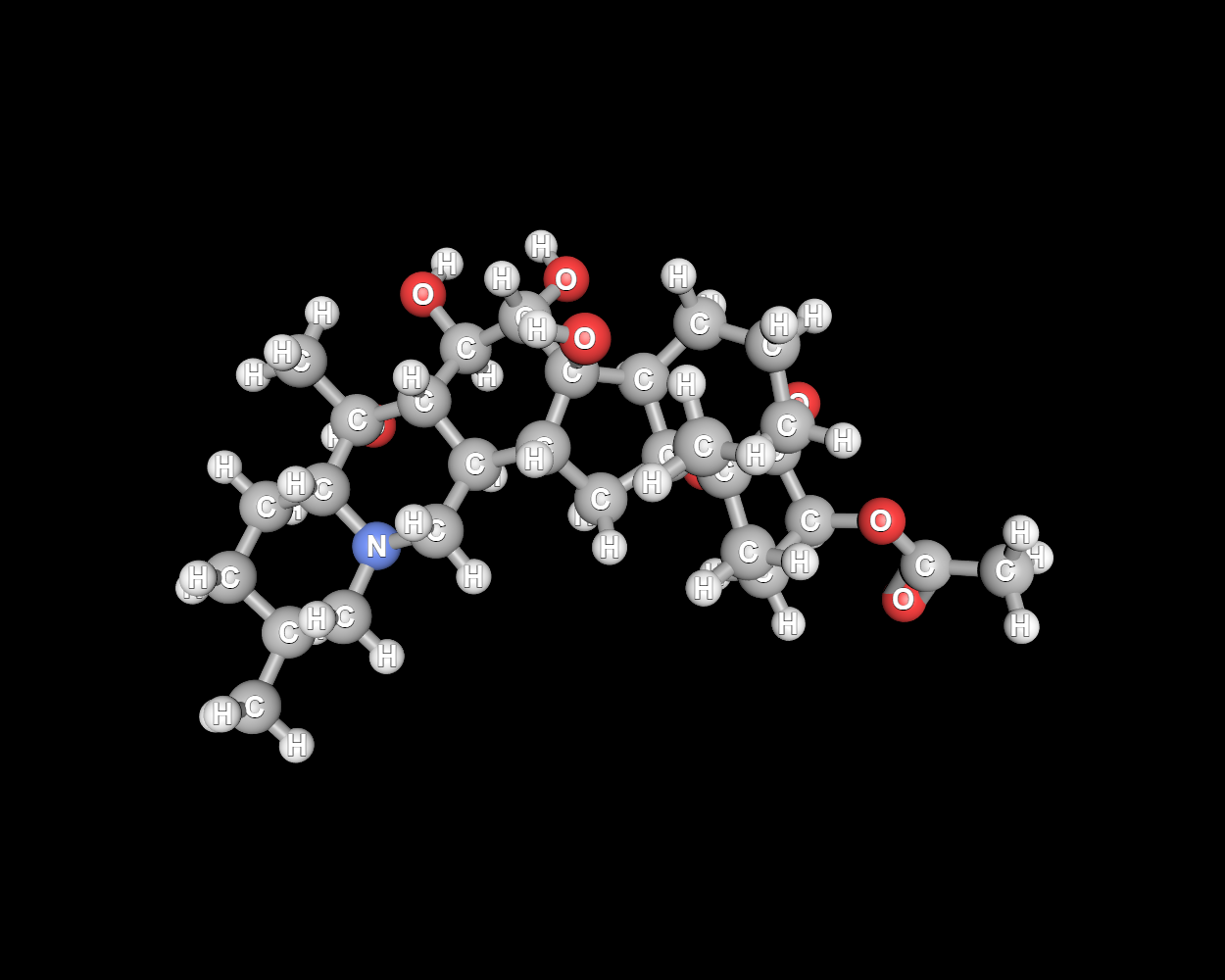

Names
- IUPAC name (5ξ,8ξ,9ξ,12ξ,14ξ)-4,14,15,16,20-Pentahydroxy-4,9-epoxycevan-3-yl acetate
- Other names Cevane-3β,4β,14,15α,16β,20-hexol, 4,9-epoxy-, 3-acetate

Identifiers
CAS Number	2777-79-9
3D model (JSmol)	Interactive image
ChemSpider	10181195
PubChem CID	3083781
UNII	BAY5Z5MC9Z
CompTox Dashboard (EPA)	DTXSID00950455
- InChI: InChI=1S/C29H45NO8/c1-14-5-8-20-26(4,34)22-16(13-30(20)12-14)17-11-27-19(28(17,35)24(33)23(22)32)7-6-18-25(27,3)10-9-21(37-15(2)31)29(18,36)38-27/h14,16-24,32-36H,5-13H2,1-4H3/t14-,16-,17?,18?,19?,20-,21?,22+,23?,24?,25-,26+,27?,28?,29?/m0/s1 Key: IGDRXLIXNAWBBF-UFWHGLMDSA-N
- SMILES: [H][C@@]12C[C@]34O[C@]5(O)[C@H](CC[C@@]3(C)[C@]5([H])CC[C@@]4([H])[C@]1(O)[C@@H](O)[C@H](O)[C@@]1([H])[C@@]2([H])CN2C[C@@H](C)CC[C@@]2([H])[C@@]1(C)O)OC(C)=O

Properties
Chemical formula	C_{29}H_{45}NO_{8}
Molar mass	535.678 g·mol^{−1}
- Except where otherwise noted, data are given for materials in their standard state (at 25 °C [77 °F], 100 kPa). Infobox references

Zygacine is a steroidal alkaloid of the genera Toxicoscordion, Zigadenus, Stenanthium and Anticlea of the family Melanthiaceae. These plants are commonly known and generally referred to as death camas. Death camas is prevalent throughout North America and is frequently the source of poisoning for outdoor enthusiasts and livestock due to its resemblance to other edible plants such as the wild onion. Despite this resemblance, the death camas plant lacks the distinct onion odor and is bitter to taste.

The effects of zygacine consumption are lethal. Symptoms in humans include nausea, vomiting, slowed heart rate, low blood pressure and ataxia. Poisoned animals suffer from loss of appetite, lack of coordination, digestive and excretory disorders, labored breathing, racing heartbeat and frequently death.

Suggested treatment of poisoning in humans include administering dopamine and atropine to the patient. For animals, treatment consists of atropine, picrotoxin and activated charcoal.

== History ==
Scientists first attempted to determine the toxic ingredient(s) of alkaloid extracts of Zygadenus plants in 1913. They were able to isolate zygadenine, the alkamine present in alkaloids of the genus Zigadenus. The minimal pharmacological activity of zygadenine led to subsequent investigations of Zygadenus venenosus and Zygadenus paniculatus which revealed that zygacine was one of the primary toxic components. Although it was first isolated in 1913, the structure and configuration of zygacine weren't reported until 1959.

Zygacine poisoning via ingestion of death camas had been reported in both livestock and humans as early as the nineteenth century. It has been for many years – and continues to be – responsible for the poisonings and deaths of many types of livestock including sheep, cattle, horses, pigs and fowl. A one-time loss of 500 sheep was reported in 1964 and in 1987, 250 sheep died from death camas poisoning. Poisonings generally occur in the early spring when the death camas plant is most abundant and other food sources for livestock are limited. Sheep seem to be poisoned most often due to their grazing behavior as they pull up and consume the entire plant. Moist conditions are more conducive to cattle poisoning as it makes it easier to extract the plant from the soil. Humans have also fallen victim to zygacine poisoning by mistaking the death camas for other edible plants. In 1994, a man presented to the emergency department with gastrointestinal symptoms, a depressed heart rate and low blood pressure after inadvertently eating plant material derived from a species of Zigadenus. He recovered after being treated.

== Toxicity ==
Zygacine is a highly potent compound with an LD_{50} of 2.0 ± 0.2 mg/kg when administered intravenously and 132 ± 21 mg/kg when administered orally to mice. The lethal dose conversions for a 60 kg human, 600 kg cow and 80 kg sheep are included in the table below.

LD_{50} of zygacine
Subject	Human (60 kg)	Cattle (600 kg)	Sheep (80 kg)
IV administration	108–132 mg	1.08–1.32 g	144–176 mg
Oral administration	6.66–9.18 g	66.60–91.80 g	8.88–12.24 g

General symptoms of zygacine poisoning among humans and animals alike include but are not limited to gastrointestinal and cardiovascular ailments such as nausea, vomiting, diarrhea and irregular heartbeat.

Within an hour of ingesting the toxic death camas plant, a human will begin to experience nausea, vomiting, abdominal cramping and diarrhea. Other symptoms include low heart rate and blood pressure as well as ataxia and muscle spasms.

Initial signs of zygacine poisoning in animals include frothy salivation around the mouth, followed by nausea and vomiting. Severely poisoned animals will suffer from a loss in appetite, lack of coordination and depression. Sheep, in particular, will stand with their heads and ears dropped with their backs are arched. Intestinal peristalsis, a condition characterized by involuntary movement of the muscles in the digestive tract, results in frequent defecation and urination. Fatally poisoned animals develop a weak and rapid pulse and labored breathing. The shuddering struggle to breathe may be confused with convulsions.

== Mechanism ==
Zygacine is a steroidal alkaloid of the veratrum type. Veratrum alkaloid compounds act by attaching to voltage-gated sodium ion channels, altering their permeability. Veratrum alkaloids cause affected sodium channels to reactivate 1000x slower than unaffected channels. They also block inactivation of sodium channels and change their activation threshold so they remain open even at resting potential. As a result, sodium concentrations within the cell rise, leading to increased nerve and muscle excitability. This biochemical activity causes muscle contractions, repetitive firing of the nerves and an irregular heart rhythm from stimulation of vagal nerves which control the parasympathetic functions of the heart, lungs and digestive tract.

== Treatment ==
There is no antidote for zygacine poisoning so only the symptoms arising from poisoning in humans are usually treated, of which bradycardia and hypotension are prioritized. These symptoms are initially treated with atropine, a muscarinic receptor antagonist. In a case study in which atropine was not sufficient, hypotension and bradycardia were successfully treated using dopamine. Dopamine increases renal sodium excretion, blood pressure and the heart rate.

For animals, reported effective treatment of zygacine poisoning consists of injection of 2 mg of atropine sulfate and 8 mg of picrotoxin per 45 kg of body weight. Intravenous fluid therapy is used to increase blood pressure. A stomach tube can be used to relieve stomach pressure in bloated animals.
