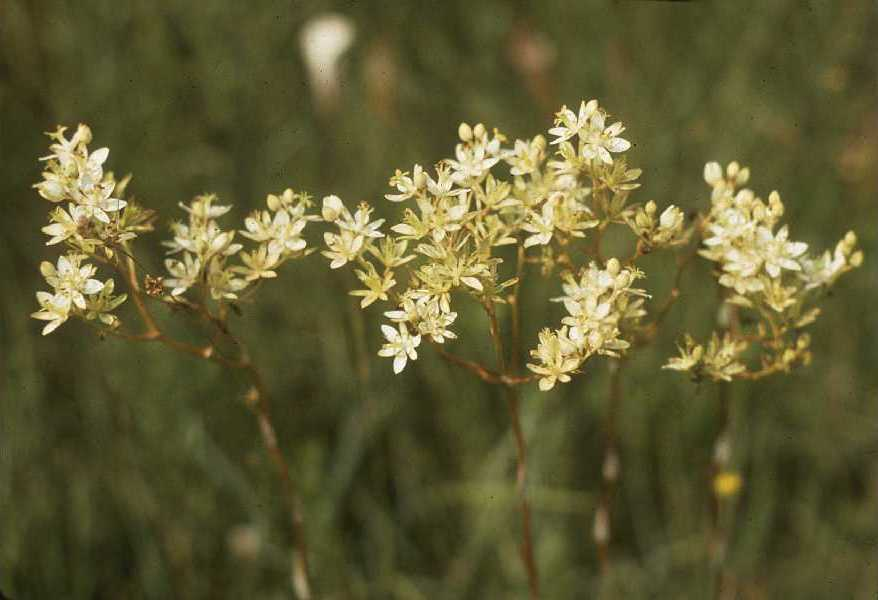

Scientific classification
- Kingdom: Plantae
- Clade: Tracheophytes
- Clade: Angiosperms
- Clade: Monocots
- Order: Liliales
- Family: Melanthiaceae
- Tribe: Melanthieae
- Genus: Zigadenus; Michx.
- Species: Z. glaberrimus

Binomial name
- Zigadenus glaberrimus Michx.

Synonyms
- Zygadenus common spelling variant; Gomphostylis Raf. [1837] non Wall. ex Lindl. [1830] illegitimate homonym (Orchidaceae); Zygadenus glaberrimus common spelling variant; Helonias glaberrima (Michx.) Sims

= Zigadenus =

Genus of plants

Zigadenus is a genus of flowering plants now containing only one species, Zigadenus glaberrimus, the sandbog death camas, found in the southeastern United States from Mississippi to Virginia. Around 20 species were formerly included in the genus, but have now been moved to other genera.

== Description ==
Zigadenus glaberrimus generally grows to a height of 60–120 cm (2–4 ft). A total of 30–70 flowers are borne in panicles. Each white to cream colored flower is bell-shaped, 20–30 mm (0.8–1.2 in) across. The tepals of the flower remain attached to the fruit capsule when it forms. The cone shaped seed capsules are 10–15 mm (0.4–0.6 in) long by 4–7 mm (0.2–0.3 in) across.

Zigadenus glaberrimus flowers from mid July to September. It is found growing in pine bogs, savannas and sandy pinelands in the US states of Alabama, Florida, Georgia, Mississippi, Virginia, North Carolina and South Carolina.

== Systematics ==
The genus is a member of the family Melanthiaceae, tribe Melanthieae. Molecular phylogenetic studies in the 21st century have resulted in number of changes to placements within this tribe. (See also Phylogeny of Melanthieae.)

=== Species formerly placed in Zigadenus ===
Around twenty species were included in the genus as it was previously circumscribed. Zigadenus glaberrimus, sandbog deathcamas, is the only species remaining in the genus. Species which have been transferred to other genera are listed below.

- Amianthium muscitotoxum – flypoison
- Anticlea elegans – elegant camas, alkali grass, mountain deathcamas
- Anticlea hintoniorum
- Anticlea mogollonensis – Mogollon deathcamas
- Anticlea neglecta
- Anticlea sibirica
- Anticlea vaginata – sheathed deathcamas
- Anticlea virescens – green deathcamas
- Anticlea volcanica – lava deathcamas
- Stenanthium densum – Osceola's plume, black snakeroot, crow poison
- Stenanthium gramineum – featherbells
- Stenanthium leimanthoides – pinebarren deathcamas
- Toxicoscordion brevibracteatum – desert deathcamas
- Toxicoscordion exaltatum – giant deathcamas
- Toxicoscordion fontanum – smallflower deathcamas
- Toxicoscordion fremontii – Fremont's deathcamas, star zigadene – (several varieties)
- Toxicoscordion nuttallii – Nuttall's deathcamas
- Toxicoscordion paniculatum – foothill deathcamas, sand-corn
- Toxicoscordion venenosum – deathcamas, meadow deathcamas – (several varieties)
- Toxicoscordion micranthum – smallflower deathcamas

== Toxicity ==
Like all the species previously included in this genus, all parts of Z. glaberrimus are toxic, due to the presence of alkaloids such as zygacine. Grazing animals, such as sheep and cattle, may be affected and this or related species have caused human fatalities.
