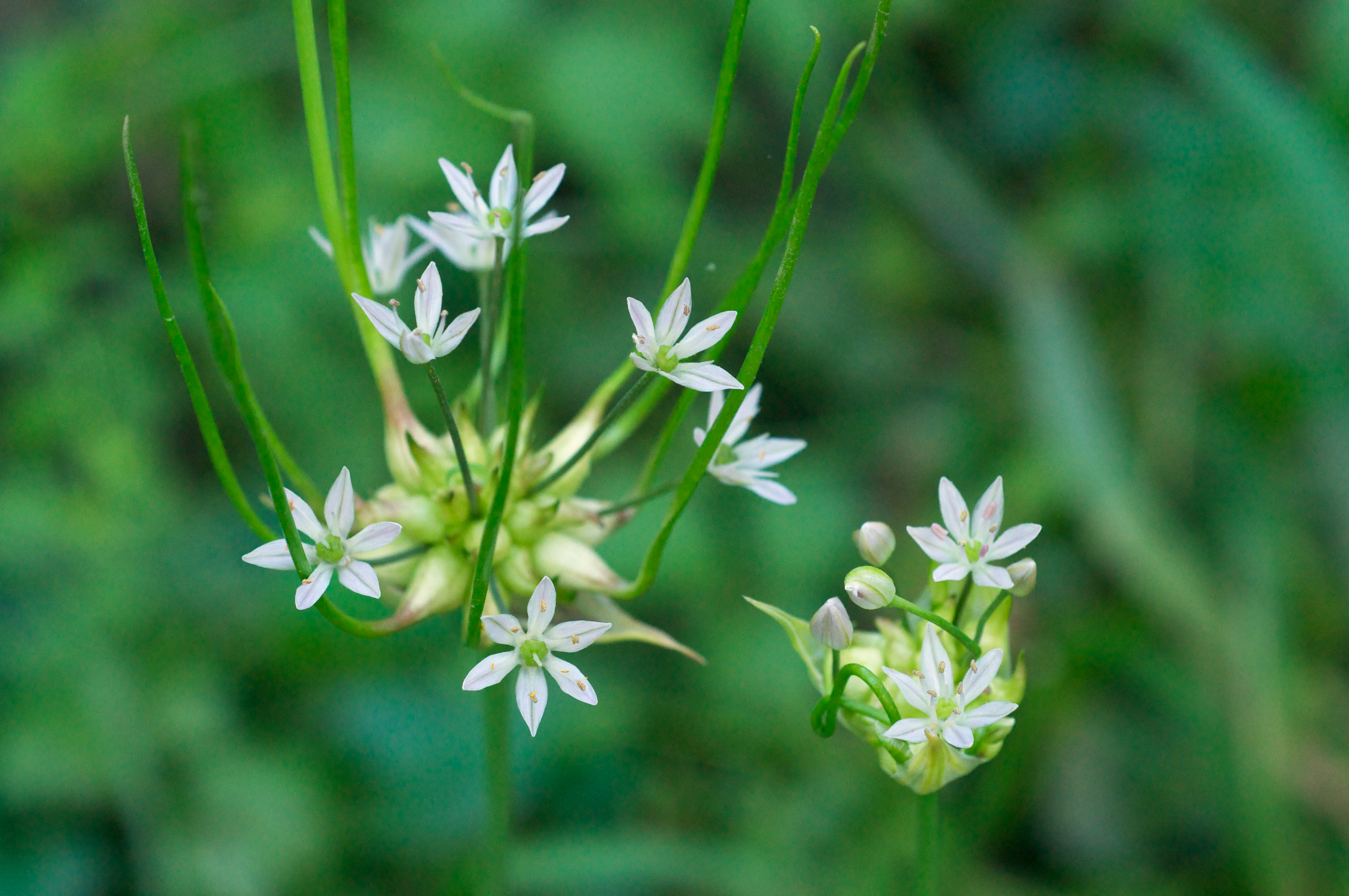

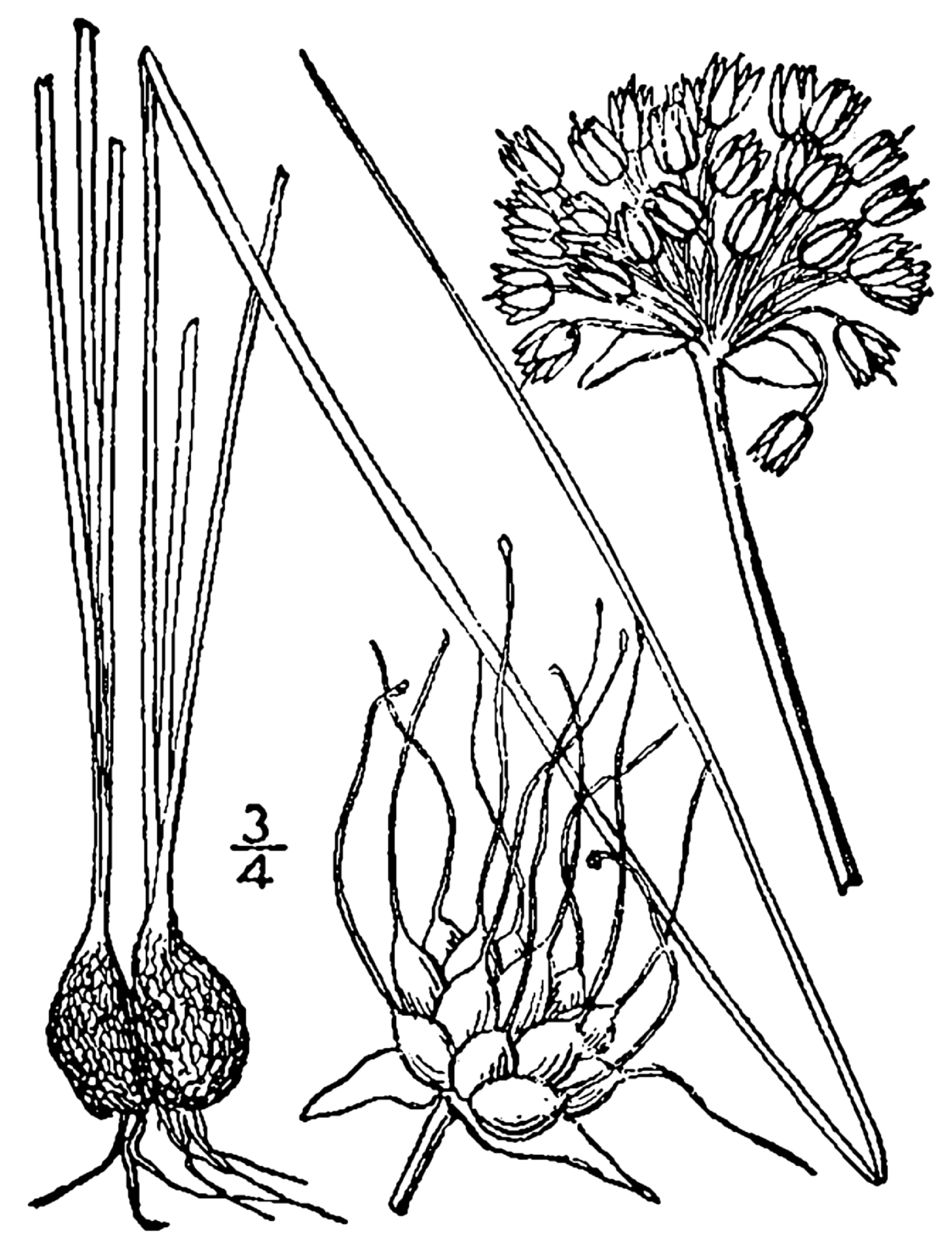
- 1913 drawing.

Conservation status
- Secure (NatureServe)

Scientific classification
- Kingdom: Plantae
- Clade: Embryophytes
- Clade: Tracheophytes
- Clade: Angiosperms
- Clade: Monocots
- Order: Asparagales
- Family: Amaryllidaceae
- Subfamily: Allioideae
- Genus: Allium
- Subgenus: A. subg. Amerallium
- Species: A. canadense

Binomial name
- Allium canadense L.

Synonyms
- Allium acetabulum (Raf.) Shinners; Allium canadense var. ovoideum Farw.; Allium canadense var. robustum Farw.; Allium continuum Small; Geboscon acetabulum Raf.; Kalabotis canadensis (L.) Raf.

= Allium canadense =

Canada onion

Species of flowering plant

Allium canadense, the Canada onion, Canadian garlic, wild garlic, meadow garlic and wild onion is a perennial plant native to eastern North America (Note: In Canadian French, the plant is known as ail du Canada ("Canadian garlic") and oignons des prairies ("onion of the prairies/meadows").) from Texas to Florida to New Brunswick to Montana. The species is also cultivated in other regions as an ornamental and as a garden culinary herb. The plant is also reportedly naturalized in Cuba.

== Description ==
Allium canadense has an edible bulb covered with a dense skin of brown fibers. The plant also has strong onion odor and taste. Crow garlic (Allium vineale) is similar, but it has a strong garlic taste.

The narrow, grass-like leaves originate near the base of the stem, which is topped by a dome-like cluster of star-shaped, pink or white flowers. These flowers may be partially or entirely replaced by bulblets. When present, the flowers are hermaphroditic (both male and female organs) and are pollinated by American bees (not honeybees) and other insects. It typically flowers in the spring and early summer, from May to June.

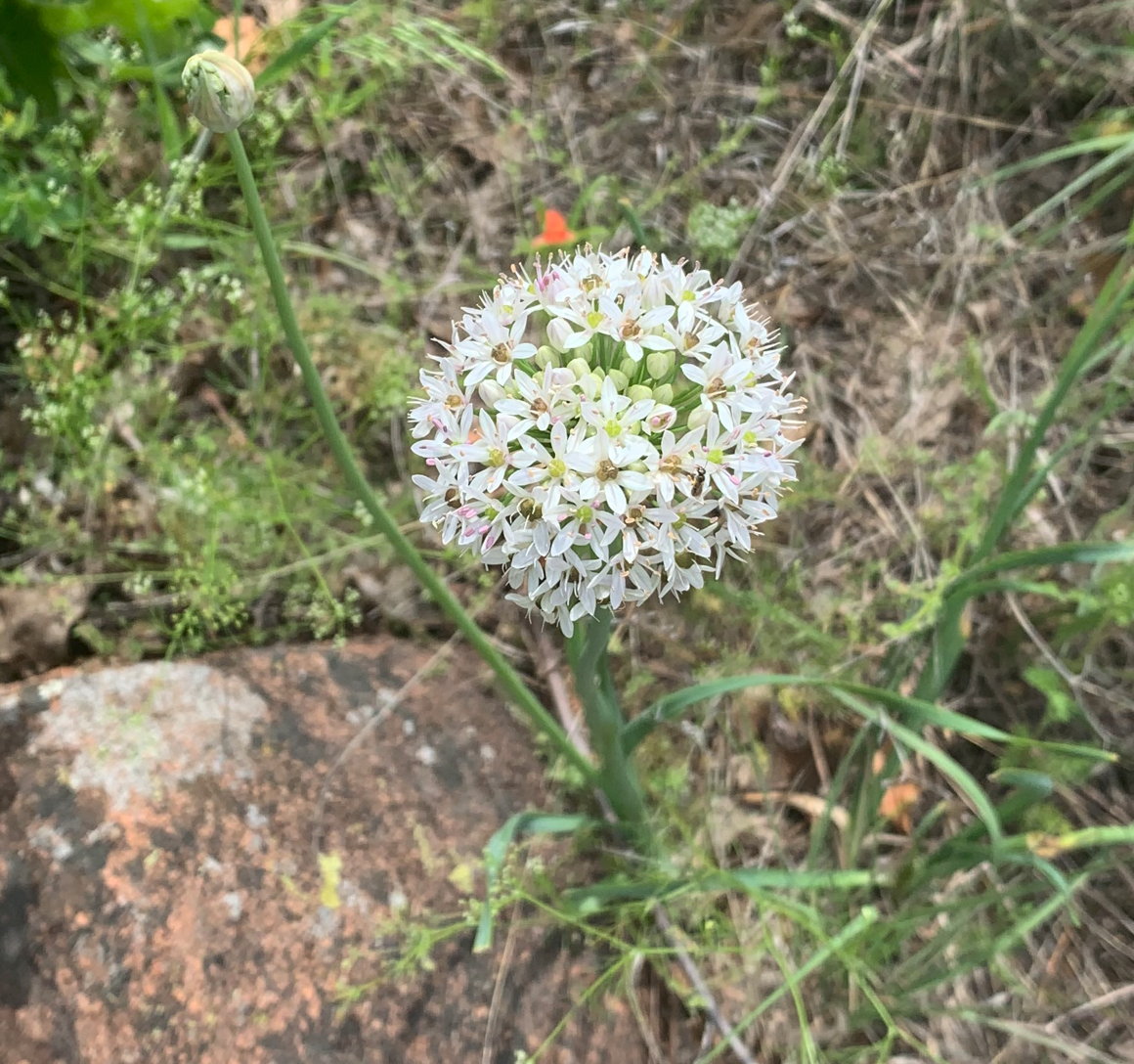
Allium canadense var. hyacinthoides in the Wichita Mountains of southwest Oklahoma.

== Varieties ==
The bulblet-producing form is classified as A. canadense var. canadense. It was once thought that the tree onion could be related to this plant, but it is now known that the cultivated tree onion is a hybrid between the common onion (A. cepa) and Welsh onion (A. fistulosum), classified as A. × proliferum.

Five varieties of the species are widely recognized:

- Allium canadense var. canadense - most pedicels replaced by bulbils, rarely producing fruits or seeds; most of the range of the species.
- Allium canadense var. ecristatum Ownbey tepals deep pink and rather thick; coastal plain of Texas.
- Allium canadense var. fraseri Ownbey - flowers white; Great Plains from Texas to Kansas.
- Allium canadense var. hyacinthoides (Bush) Ownbey - tepals pink, thin, flowers fragrant; northern Texas and southern Oklahoma.
- Allium canadense var. lavandulare (Bates) Ownbey & Aase - flowers lavender, not fragrant; northern Arkansas to South Dakota.
- Allium canadense var. mobilense (Regel) Ownbey - flowers lilac, lacks bulblets; southeastern US.

== Uses ==
The Canada onion is cultivated as a vegetable in home gardens in Cuba, (Note: In Cuban Spanish, known mainly as cebolla silvestre ("wild onion"), with other rare colloquial names.) scattered locally in the south to western parts of the island. It was formerly collected from the wild to be eaten by Native Americans and by European settlers. People in the Cherokee Nation and Chickasaw Nation continue the tradition of picking and cooking wild onions in early spring. Various Native American tribes also used the plant for other purposes: for example, rubbing the plant on the body for protection from insect, lizard, scorpion, and tarantula bites.

The whole plant can be eaten raw, with the tougher outer layers removed. It can also be cooked and included in any recipe calling for onions. However, there have been reported cases of poisoning when deathcamas bulbs were mistaken for wild onions. Additionally, long term consumption of wild onion bulbs reduces iodine uptake by the thyroid gland. This can worsen iodine deficiency for people with a diet that is low in iodine. Horses are vulnerable to developing hemolytic anemia from eating wild onion leaves.
