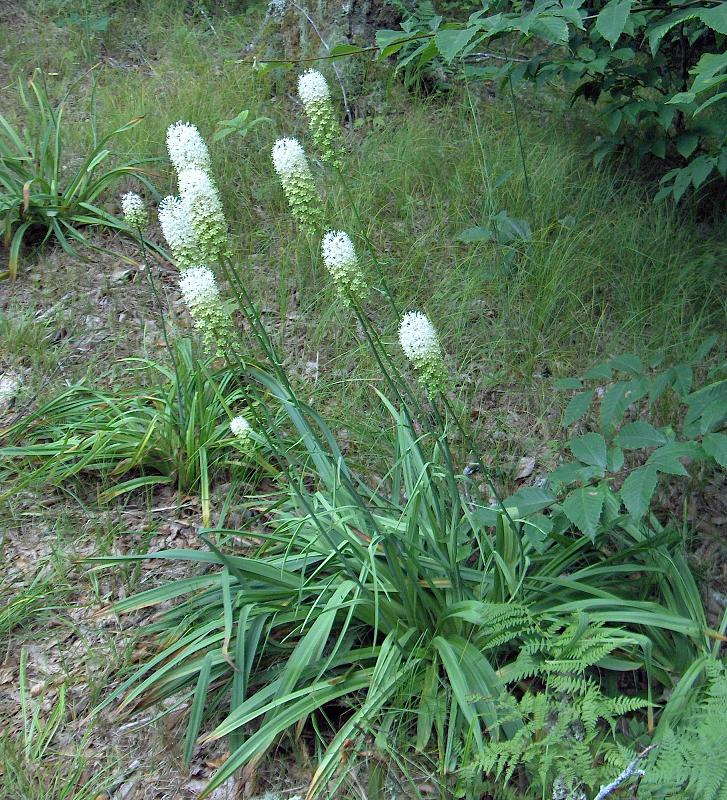
- in Great Smoky Mountains National Park

Conservation status
- Apparently Secure (NatureServe)

Scientific classification
- Kingdom: Plantae
- Clade: Tracheophytes
- Clade: Angiosperms
- Clade: Monocots
- Order: Liliales
- Family: Melanthiaceae
- Tribe: Melanthieae
- Genus: Amianthium; A.Gray
- Species: A. muscitoxicum

Binomial name
- Amianthium muscitoxicum (Walter) A.Gray

Synonyms
- Synonymy: Amianthium muscaetoxicum, common misspelling; Melanthium muscaetoxicum Walter; Melanthium muscitoxicum Walter; Zigadenus muscitoxicum (Walter) Regel; Chrosperma muscitoxicum (Walter) Kuntze; Chrysosperma muscatoxicum (Walter) Kuntze; Melanthium laetum Aiton.; Anthericum subtrigynum Jacq.; Melanthium myoctonum J.F.Gmel.; Melanthium phalangioides Desr.; Helonias erythrosperma Michx.; Helonias laeta (Aiton) Ker Gawl.; Leimanthium laetum (Aiton) Willd.; Leimanthium pallidum Willd.; Chrosperma laetum (Aiton) Raf.; Amianthium macrotox Raf.; Crosperma laeta (Aiton) Raf.; Crosperma phalangioides (Desr.) Raf.

= Amianthium =

Fly poison

Genus of plants

Amianthium is a genus of perennial monocot plants found in eastern North America. The genus contains only one species, known as Amianthium muscitoxicum. Its common names include "fly poison" and "stagger grass". The species name muscitoxicum comes from a direct Latin translation of "fly poison": muscae = flies, toxicum = poison. The entire plant is poisonous to an array of species, including humans, and the bulb is particularly toxic. A. muscitoxicum was first recorded by Thomas Walter in his work Flora Caroliniana in 1788.

== Description ==
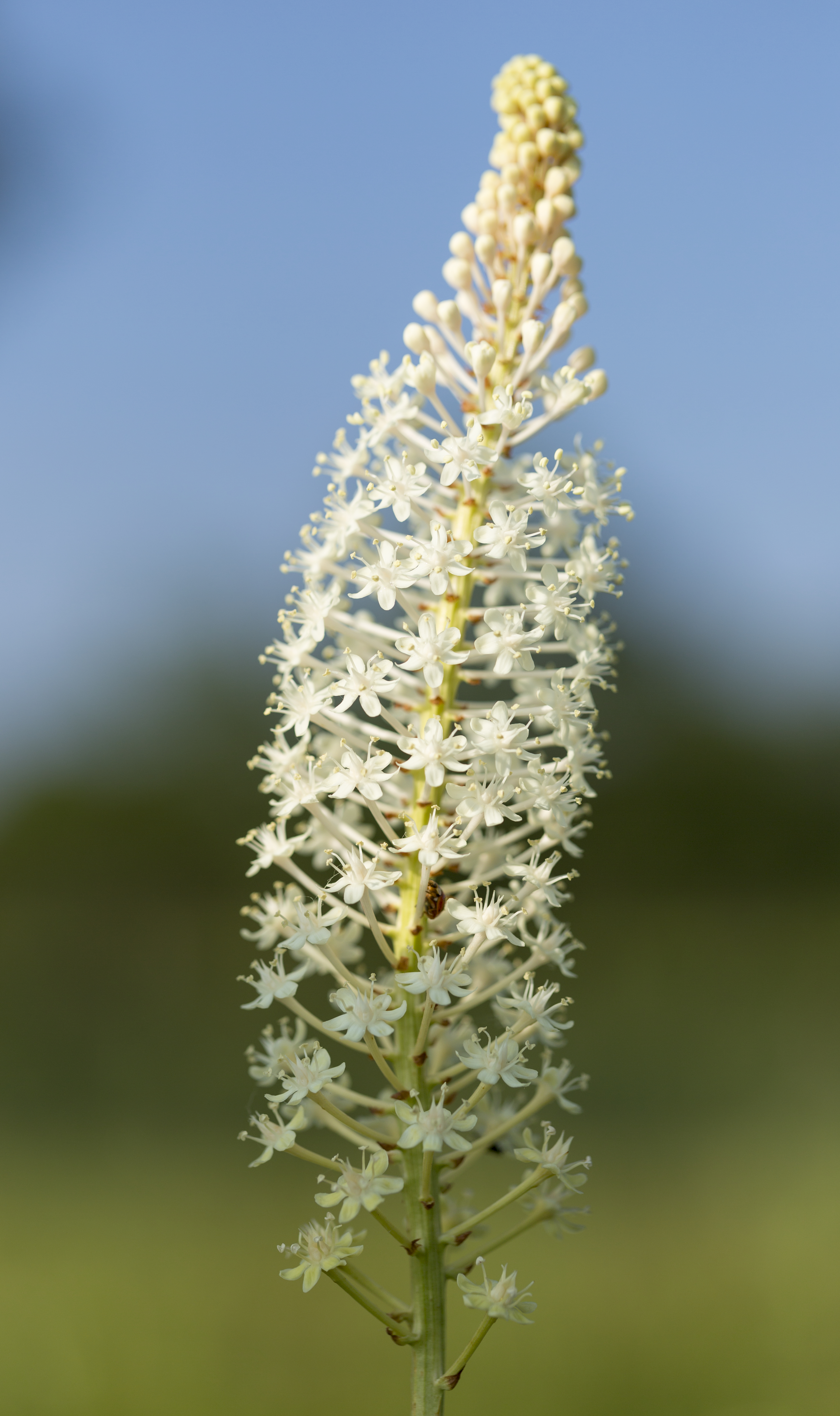
The indeterminate, bracteate raceme of A. muscitoxicum.

Amianthium muscitoxicum blooms between May and July with small white flowers that turn greenish or purplish with age. Its flowers form an indeterminate bracteate raceme inflorescence. It blooms from the bottom of the inflorescence upwards, eventually forming small, bright orange fruits in the late summer or fall.

A. muscitoxicum can grow 1–4 feet tall. Its main leaves are at the base of the plant; they are thin and can grow more than 12in long. It also has leaves along the length of the stem, but they are very reduced.

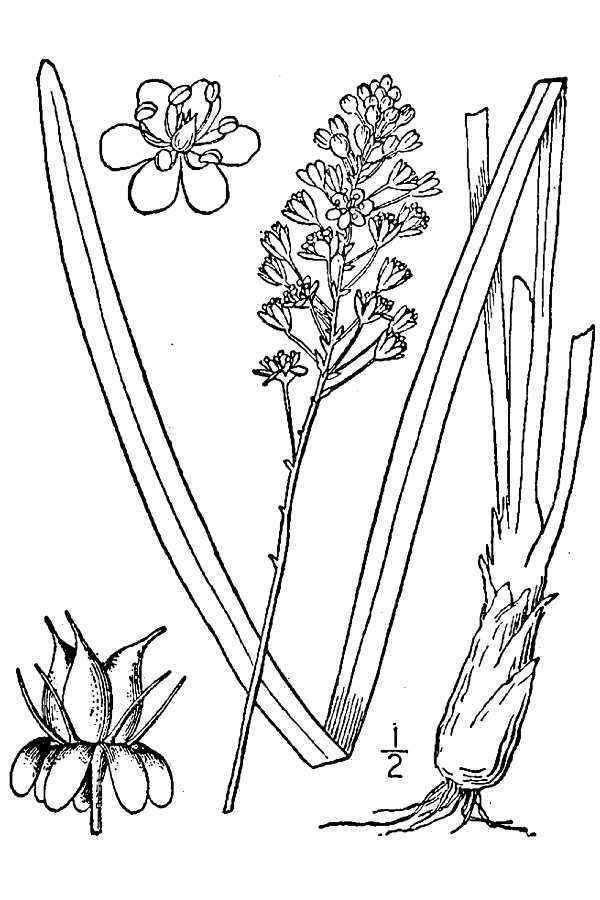
1913 Illustration of Amianthium muscitoxicum (Note: Illustration from Britton & Brown's An illustrated flora of the northern United States, Canada and the British Possessions. (1913) as Chrosperma muscitoxicum)

== Habitat and Distribution ==
Amianthium muscitoxicum is native to the eastern United States from New York to Florida and can be found as far west as Missouri and Oklahoma. Its native habitats include oak forests, bogs, low pinelands, savannas, meadows, and sandhills.

It does best in partial shade, with 1–2 hours of direct sunlight. Companion plants include: longleaf pine, willow oak, mountain laurel, blueberries, galax, heartleaf, foamflowers, smilacina, Soloman's seal, dwarf iris, jack-in-the-pulpit, black cohosh, grasses.

== Mating and Sexual Systems ==
Amianthium muscitoxicum is self-incompatible and is mainly pollinated by five species of beetle, predominantly Strangalepta abbreviata. These beetles are rewarded by nectar produced within each flower, with beetles spending significantly more time at flowers with higher nectar volumes.

A. muscitoxicum exhibits partial dichogamy, meaning there is a separation in the timing of male and female reproductive function. Specifically, it is protandrous, which means that the pollen is produced before the stigma becomes receptive to other pollen. Nectar production varies with the sexual phase of each flower, accumulating through the lifecycle and peaking just after anthesis, when the flower blooms and is functional. This species has a high potential for multiple mating, which generally increases fitness due to greater genetic diversity of seeds and a higher likelihood of a compatible cross.

== Toxicity ==
Amianthium muscitoxicum contains toxic alkaloids, and as such, is highly poisonous when ingested by livestock, humans and other animals. Four toxic alkaloids were isolated from the plant in 1953: jervine, two unknown ester alkaloids, and amianthine (an alkamine). These compounds are found in all parts of the plant, with especially high concentrations in the bulbs.

Historical experiments tested the toxicity on sheep and cattle. Observed symptoms included cessation of eating and excess production of saliva, nausea followed by vomiting, rapid pulse, rapid and irregular respiration, weakness, and difficulty walking. When fatal, death occurred in about an hour. This is the origin for "stagger grass" as a common name for this plant.

== Uses ==
Amianthium muscitoxicum's common name "fly poison," comes from its use by early colonists as a way to control flies. The bulbs can be ground down and mixed with something sweet, such as molasses or honey, to attract flies. When flies drink it, they become unstable and have difficulty moving. After 24 hours or so, if the flies have not been removed, the poison will wear and off and they are seemingly fine.

== Classification ==
Amianthium muscitoxicum is a member of the family Melanthiaceae and the tribe Melanthieae. Melanthieae contains seven genera, including Melanthium and Amianthium. A. muscitoxicum, sometimes spelled muscaetoxicum, was first classified in the genus Melanthium by Thomas Walter in 1788. More recent molecular and genetic research has firmly classified it in the genus Amianthium, which is characterized by a unique alkaloid that it contains: amianthine. A. muscitoxicum is the only species within this genus. (See also Phylogeny of Melanthieae.)

Amianthium species which have been placed in other genera include:

- Amianthium angustifolium A.Gray now called Stenanthium densum (Desr.) Zomlefer & Judd
- Amianthium aspericaule A.Gray) now called Triantha glutinosa (Michx.) Baker
- Amianthium leimanthoides A.Gray) now called Stenanthium densum (Desr.) Zomlefer & Judd
- Amianthium nuttallii A.Gray now called Toxicoscordion nuttallii (A.Gray) Rydb.
- Amianthium texanum (Bush) R.R.Gates now called Stenanthium densum (Desr.) Zomlefer & Judd
