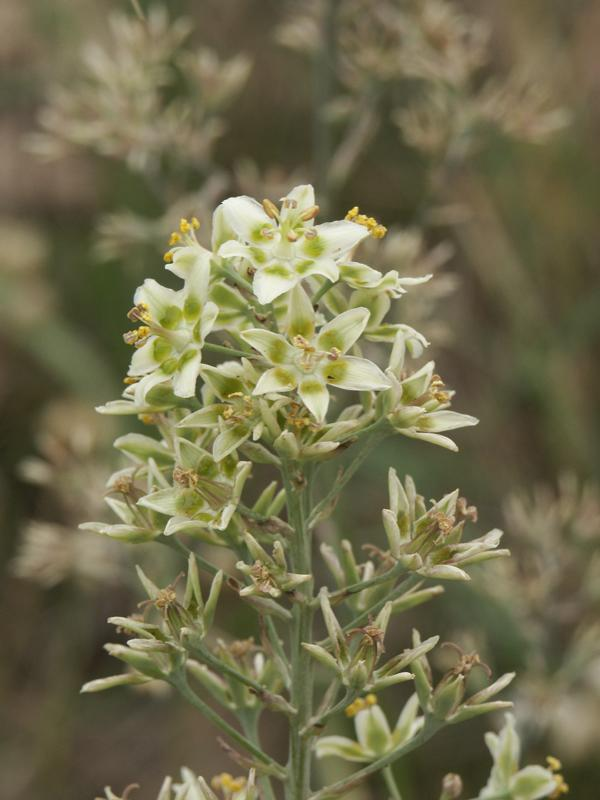
- Flowers of Anticlea elegans

Scientific classification
- Kingdom: Plantae
- Clade: Embryophytes
- Clade: Tracheophytes
- Clade: Spermatophytes
- Clade: Angiosperms
- Clade: Monocots
- Order: Liliales
- Family: Melanthiaceae
- Tribe: Melanthieae
- Genus: Anticlea; Kunth

Synonyms
- Monadenus Salisb.; Stenanthella Rydb.

= Anticlea (plant) =

Genus of flowering plants

Anticlea is a genus of flowering plants in the family Melanthiaceae, tribe Melanthieae. Molecular phylogenetic studies in the 21st century have resulted in number of changes to placements within this tribe. Anticlea was long submerged into the genus Zigadenus; however its separate position has been confirmed. Some species were also moved from Stenanthium into Anticlea. (See also Phylogeny of Melanthieae.) Members of Anticlea may also be distinguished from other members of the former genus Zigadenus, the deathcamases, by the presence of narrow tepals with a single, conspicuous, bilobed gland. It also has a wider distribution, occurring in Asia and much of North and Central America, ranging south to Guatemala.

Species

- Anticlea elegans (syn. Zigadenus elegans) - Elegant camas, alkali grass, mountain deathcamas - W + N United States, Alaska, Canada, Chihuahua
- Anticlea frigida (syn. Stenanthium frigidum) - Veracruz
- Anticlea hintoniorum (syn. Zigadenus hintoniorum) - Hinton's deathcamas - Coahuila, Nuevo León, Oaxaca
- Anticlea mogollonensis (syn. Zigadenus mogollonensis) - Mogollon deathcamas - New Mexico
- Anticlea neglecta (syn. Zigadenus neglectus) - Guanajuato, Querétaro
- Anticlea occidentalis (syn. Stenanthium occidentale) - Western featherbells or Bronze-Bells - BC, Alb, Sask, WA, OR, ID, MT, N CA
- Anticlea sachalinensis (syn. Stenanthium sachalinense) - Khabarovsk, Sakhalin
- Anticlea sibirica (syn. Zigadenus sibiricus) - much of Russian Federation, China, Mongolia, Korea, Rebun, Rishiri
- Anticlea virescens (syn. Zigadenus virescens) - Green deathcamas - Colorado + Arizona south to Oaxaca
- Anticlea volcanica (syn. Zigadenus volcanicus) - Lava deathcamas - C + S Mexico, Guatemala

The genus name of Anticlea is in honour of Anticlea of Ithaca from Greek mythology, Anticlea or Anticlia was a queen of Ithaca as the wife of King Laërtes.
