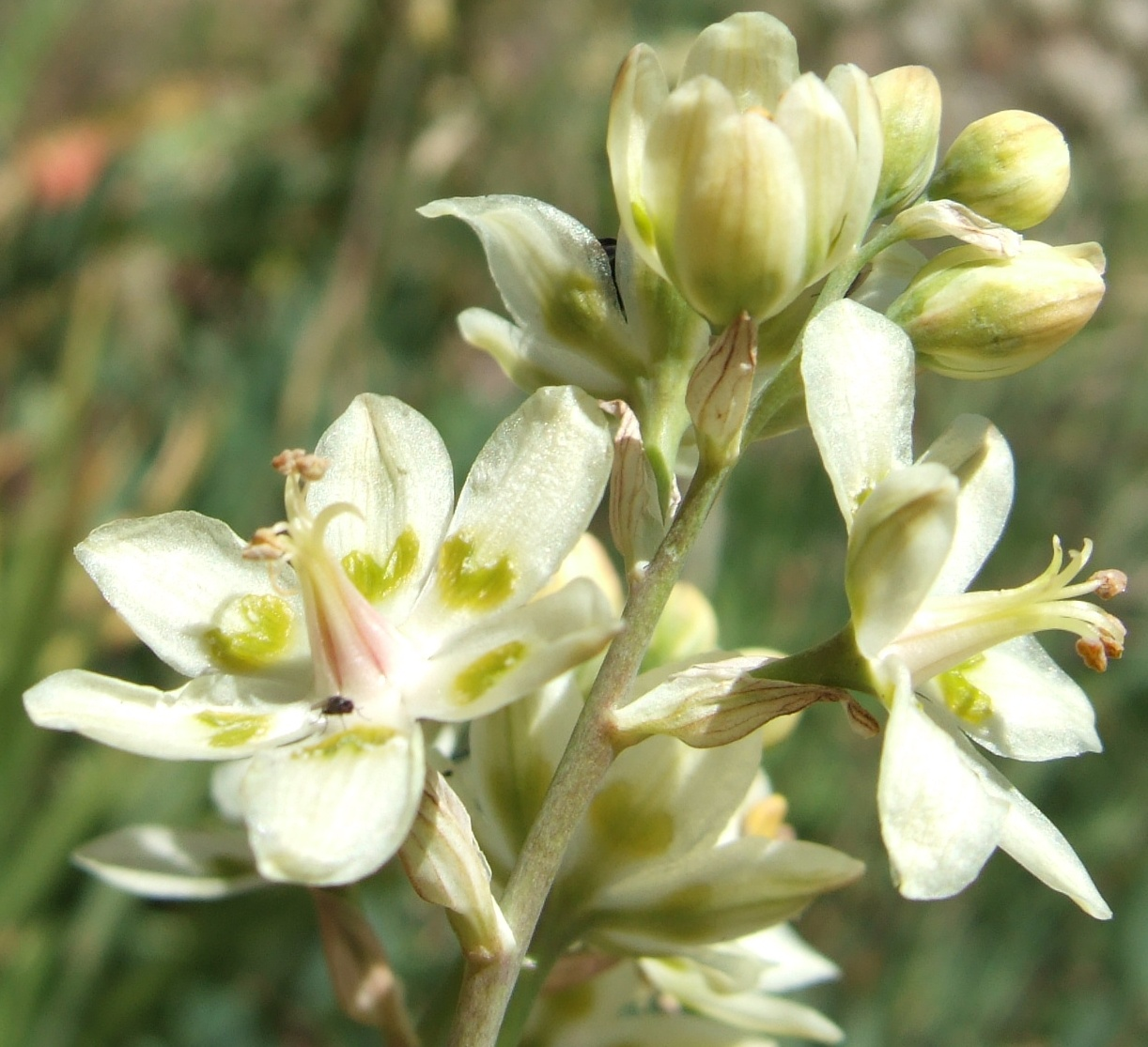

Conservation status
- Secure (NatureServe)

Scientific classification
- Kingdom: Plantae
- Clade: Tracheophytes
- Clade: Angiosperms
- Clade: Monocots
- Order: Liliales
- Family: Melanthiaceae
- Genus: Anticlea
- Species: A. elegans

Binomial name
- Anticlea elegans (Pursh) Rydb.

Subspecies
- A. elegans subsp. elegans; A. elegans subsp. glauca (Nutt.) A.Haines; A. elegans subsp. vaginata (Rydb.) Palmquist & T.J.Ayers

Synonyms
- Zigadenus elegans Pursh; A. elegans subsp. elegans synonymy: Anticlea alpina (Blank.) A.Heller, 1910; Anticlea chlorantha (Richardson) Rydb., 1903; Anticlea coloradensis (Rydb.) Rydb., 1903; Anticlea gracilenta (Greene) R.R.Gates, 1918; Anticlea longa (Greene) A.Heller, 1910; Anticlea mohinorensis (Greenm.) R.R.Gates, 1918; Gomphostylis bracteata (Sims) Raf., 1837; Helonias bracteata Sims, 1815; Melanthium hultgreenii Thunb., 1819; Zigadenus alpinus Blank., 1905; Zigadenus bracteatus (Sims) Sweet, 1826; Zigadenus canadensis Baker, 1879; Zigadenus chloranthus Richardson in J.Franklin, 1823; Zigadenus chloranthus var. major Hook., 1838; Zigadenus chloranthus var. minor Hook. & Arn., 1840; Zigadenus coloradensis Rydb., 1900; Zigadenus commutatus Schult. & Schult.f. in J.J.Roemer & J.A.Schultes, 1830; Zigadenus dilatatus Greene, 1901; Zigadenus elegans var. coloradensis (Rydb.) M.E.Jones, 1910; Zigadenus gracilentus Greene, 1901; Zigadenus longus Greene, 1901; Zigadenus mohinorensis Greenm., 1903; Zigadenus speciosus Douglas ex Hook, 1838; Zigadenus speciosus var. minor Greene, 1894; Zigadenus washakie A.Nelson, 1926; A. elegans subsp. glauca synonymy: Anticlea elegans var. glauca (Nutt.) Zomlefer & Judd, 2009; Anticlea glauca (Nutt.) Kunth, 1843; Evonyxis glauca (Nutt.) Raf., 1837; Leimanthium glaucum (Nutt.) Schult. & Schult.f. in J.J.Roemer & J.A.Schultes, 1830; Melanthium glaucum Nutt., 1818; Zigadenus elegans subsp. glaucus (Nutt.) Hultén, 1973; Zigadenus elegans var. glaucus (Nutt.) Preece in H.A.Gleason & A.Cronquist, 1991; Zigadenus glaucus (Nutt.) Nutt., 1834; A. elegans subsp. vaginata synonymy: Anticlea vaginata Rydb., 1912; Zigadenus vaginatus (Rydb.) J.F.Macbr., 1918

= Anticlea elegans =

Mountain deathcamas

Species of plant

Anticlea elegans, commonly known as mountain deathcamas, elegant camas, or glaucous death-camas, is a trillium-relative in the flowering plant family Melanthiaceae. Three distinct subspecies are included Anticlea elegans subsp. elegans, the type subspecies, plus Anticlea elegans subsp. glauca and Anticlea elegans subsp. vaginata. Anticlea elegans subsp. vaginata is likely a result of a vicariance event at the end of the Pleistocene and the populations are genetically drifting apart. Glacial refugia in at least five US states have formerly hosted populations of Anticlea elegans subsp. glauca, though two are now extirpated. The species is native to most of North America, being absent from California and the Baja California peninsula, the deep southeastern United States, and the far north of Canada. Little is known about the species pollinators, with a small population in Idaho documented to be likely pollinated mostly by flies.

== Description ==
=== Morphology ===
It has white lily-like flowers and two-pronged, greenish-yellow heart shaped glands on each petal (the shape of which can help in distinguishing it from other members of the genus). Plants on the western side of the continent tend to be smaller in size than their eastern counterparts, but have more densely clustered flowers. The linear leaves are smooth in texture and sprout mostly from base of the plant, with average lengths between 1 and 2.5 cm (0.39 and 0.98 in) and a maximum width of 15 mm (0.59 in). Few leaves are born on the flower stems, and are reduced in size, decreasing in size the further from base upwards on the stem. Fruits are capsular and range between 15 and 20 mm (0.59 and 0.79 in) long.

=== Phytochemistry ===
The plant may be toxic as has been shown for related Toxicoscordion venenosum and T. paniculatum. In sheep, Anticlea elegans has been shown to have an average minimum lethal dose of 60 g of green plant per kilogram of body weight, compared to 5 g/kg for Toxicoscordion nuttallii.

== Taxonomy ==
During the Lewis and Clark Expedition, Meriwether Lewis collected a specimen along the Blackfoot River on July 7, 1806, before summiting Lewis and Clark Pass over the continental divide that same day. The specimen was eventually passed to botanist Frederick Pursh for description. Pursh published his description of the new species Zigadenus elegans in 1814 while living in London, based on the Lewis specimen which was part of the Academy of Natural Sciences of Drexel University Lewis and Clark Herbarium. Anticlea elegans subsp. glauca was first named by Thomas Nuttall (1818) as Melanthium glaucum. Nuttall did not provide a type specimen, listing instead a distribution from the St. Lawrence and Niagara Falls west along the shores of the great lakes and then upstream along the Missouri River to Fort Mandan. Anticlea elegans subsp. vaginata, the Alcove Death Camas or Sheathed deathcamas, was first described by botanist Per Axel Rydberg (1912) in his Studies on the Rocky Mountain Flora XXVI. The type specimen was collected at Armstrong Canyon in what is now Natural Bridges National Monument, Utah sometime between August 4 and 6, 1911. The specimen was then placed into the New York Botanical Gardens herbarium as specimen Rydberg & Garrett 9407.

Placement of the species and subspecies within family Melanthiaceae has been varied, with the initial descriptions from the three nominal species all landing within a different genus, Anticlea, Melanthium, and Zigadenus. Following their publication Z. elegans was kept in the genus Zigadenus, while Melanthium glaucum was deemed a junior synonym of Zigadenus elegans, then In 1903, Rydberg split all species from Zigadenus except the nominal type species moving the split out species to Anticlea as A. elegans and A. chlorantha. This was based on the idea that only Zigadenus glaberrimus had an elongated root structure, and all the species assumed to only have bulbs were shifted to the related genus. Within a year of its publication, Anticlea vaginata was moved to Zigadenus, while the splitting of Zigadenus by Rydberg was reversed soon after. A broadly described Zigadenus was maintained by botanists until molecular analysis by Wendy Zomlefer and Walter Judd (2002) showed the grouping to be polyphyletic. They split the species into a number of monophyletic genera, including resurrecting Anticlea.

Distinction between Anticlea elegans and Anticlea vaginata was based on morphological grounds initially with floral and vegetative characters being used to support the separation. A team of researchers led by Emily Palmquist investigated the possible genetic and morphometric differentiation between the two species, with their 2015 study results being published in the journal Systematic Botany. Based on analysis of both aspects, the team determined that the hanging gardens populations are nearly indistinguishable from A. elegans and moved A. vaginata to subspecies status. The subspecies is likely the result of a vicariance event sometime around the end of the Pleistocene ice age. Increasing temperatures and changing biotic conditions pushed A. elegans habitat higher in elevation, but some groups were trapped in the hanging gardens areas resulting in genetic isolation. The conditions of the hanging gardens influenced the plant morphology, yearly reproductive cycles and began the process of genetic drift. A. elegans subsp. vaginata has several distinct alleles from the other subspecies, and flowers later then A. elegans subsp. elegans in the surrounding forests. Additionally, within the 15 populations of A. elegans subsp. vaginata, early stage genetic drift between the populations indicates the isolated groups are also separating genetically and on different evolution tracks.

== Distribution and habitat ==
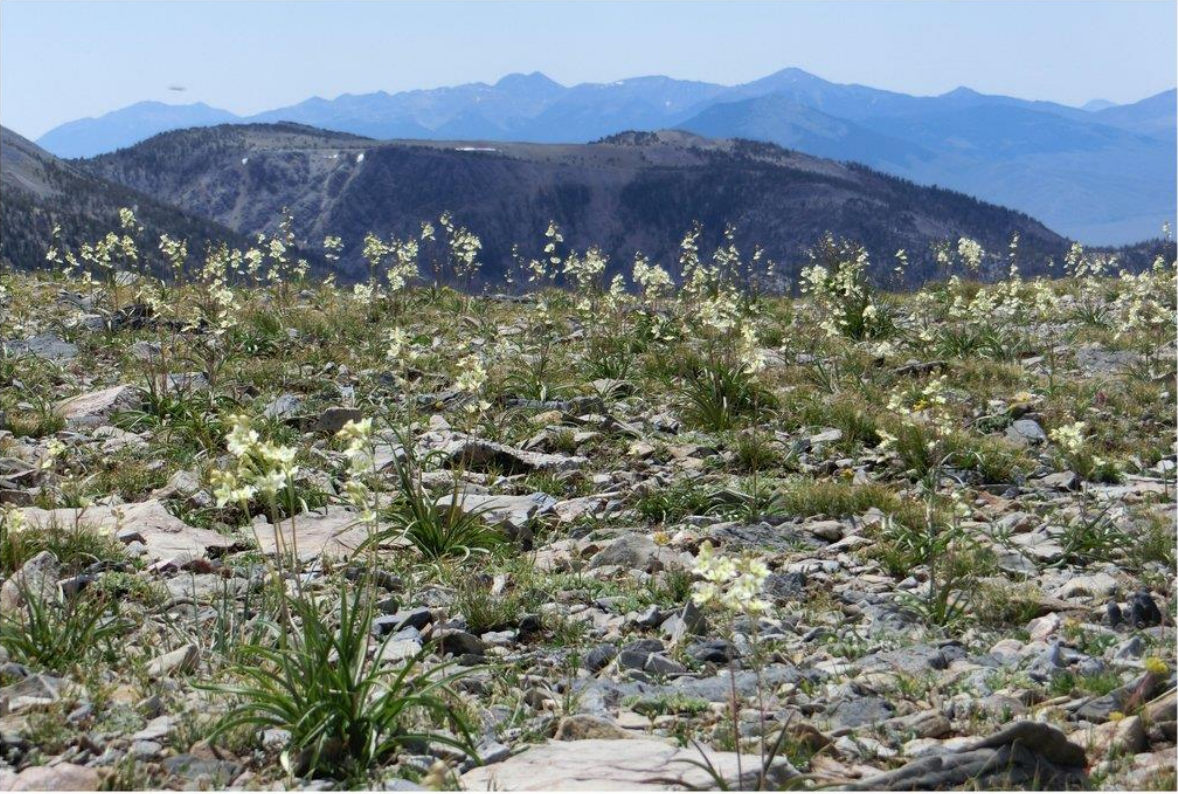
Anticlea elegans in a shale meadow, Little Sheep Mountain, Idaho

As a whole, Anticlea elegans is widely distributed through western North America, but absent from California and the southern southeast United States. In Canada its range extends from Quebec and New Brunswick west to the Northwest and Yukon Territories and into Alaska. The species extends along the Rocky Mountains of western North America south through Arizona, New Mexico, and Texas. Following the mountainous uplands, populations are found into the central areas of Mexico.

Anticlea elegans subsp. elegans is the most widely distributed of the three accepted subspecies, with a northern range extending into Alaska, the Yukon and Northern territories in western north America. In northeastern North America, the subspecies is found through Manitoba, Ontario, and Quebec, but it is absent from the eastern maritime provinces of Newfoundland, Labrador, New Brunswick, Nova Scotia, and Prince Edward Island. Along St. Lawrence Seaway river system, the subspecies overlaps with A. elegans subsp. glauca populations in Quebec, plus in upper midwestern states of Iowa, Minnesota, and the Dakotas. The western North American populations are found along the west coast from British Columbia south through Washington and Oregon but are absent from California, the Baja California peninsula and the Mexican west coast. Most southeastern populations are found in Nebraska, Colorado, New Mexico, and Texas.

The second most widespread of the subspecies is Anticlea elegans subsp. glauca which grows along the St. Lawrence Seaway on both the Canadian and United States sides of the river system. In the Great Lakes region, the subspecies is found to the south of the lakes, but is missing from Kentucky. The subspecies extends west in the grasslands to North and South Dakota plus south along the Mississippi River in Iowa and Illinois. A number of relictual glacial refugia A. elegans subsp. glauca populations have been identified in south eastern North America and New England. The populations are at sites that did not experience any glaciation and provided habitats for boreal species displaced by icesheet encroachment. Identified relict populations are or were known in Missouri, Tennessee, Vermont and West Virginia; however, the lone sites in both Tennessee and Vermont are both thought to have been extirpated by the early 2000s. A series of seven populations are known in Missouri, located across the Ozark Plateau, which is noted to harbor disjunct populations of at least 37 boreal plant species.

The rarest of the subspecies, Anticlea elegans subsp. vaginata, is restricted to the rocky hanging garden biomes of the Colorado Plateau in Arizona, Colorado and Utah. A. elegans subsp. elegans is also present in the same region, but found in the mountainous forests that surround the hanging gardens habitats. The hanging gardens are ecological hot spots where perennial springs occur in desert canyon wall alcoves supporting year round plant populations. The disjunct populations of A. elegans subsp. vaginata are all found below 1,800 m (5,900 ft) in elevation in hanging gardens with a sandstone host rock. The plants are usually growing in deeply shaded areas of the springs alcove.

== Ecology ==
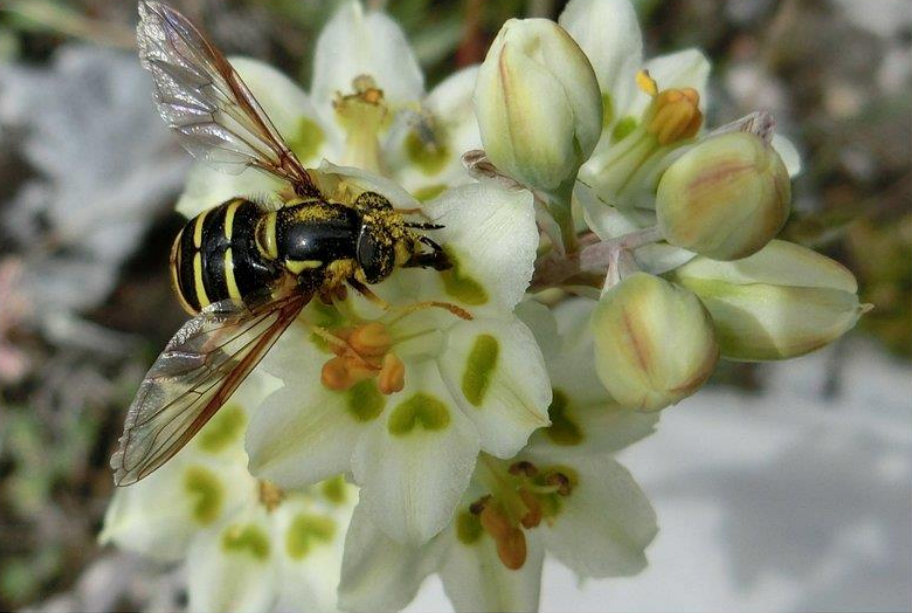
Chrysotoxum fly on flower at Little Sheep Mountain, Idaho

Two alpine populations of Anticlea elegans in a Global Observation Research Initiative in Alpine Environments area of the Lemhi Mountains of southwestern Idaho were studied in 2023 to assess pollinator ecology. Each group consisted of over 1000 plants covering 0.1–0.2 ha (11,000–22,000 ft^{2}) above the tree line on flat rocky areas of the mountain slope. The patches were monitored on July 31, 2023, with flower visitors being captured, identified, recorded, and eventually deposited in the California Academy of Sciences. At least four families of flies, Calliphoridae (carrion flies), Fanniidae (house flies), Sarcophagidae (flesh flies), and Syrphidae (flower flies) were recorded nectaring from the flowers, with syrphids being the most prevalent visitors. At least six syrphid species from the genera Chrysotoxum, Eristalis, Eupeodes and possibly Dasysyrphus were identified during collecting. During flower visits the heads and upper surfaces of the larger flies would brush across the stamens gathering coatings of pollen, which would then be transported to other flowers where contact with the stigma would complete pollination.

The flowers were also actively visited by unidentified small worker ants who collected nectar from the tepals. Due to their size, the workers they were able to visit the nectaries in the flower centers without interacting with the stamens or styles and not facilitating in pollination. Also present in the alpine area were species of both Osmia bees and Bombus bumble bees. During the observation periods, the bees visited many of the other plant species in the area, but were not documented to visit A. elegans, indicating flies including flower, carrion and flesh flies are likely the major pollinators for A. elegans in alpine areas of Idaho.

A different subalpine site at Webber Lakes in the Idaho Beaverhead Mountains west of Yellowstone National Park was studied on July 28, 2020. The A. elegans flowers at this site were dominated by Tenthredo species sawflies. Activity from the sawflies was not limited to just pollination, as a number of mating pairs were also observed, suggesting the flowers are a preferred trysting location.
