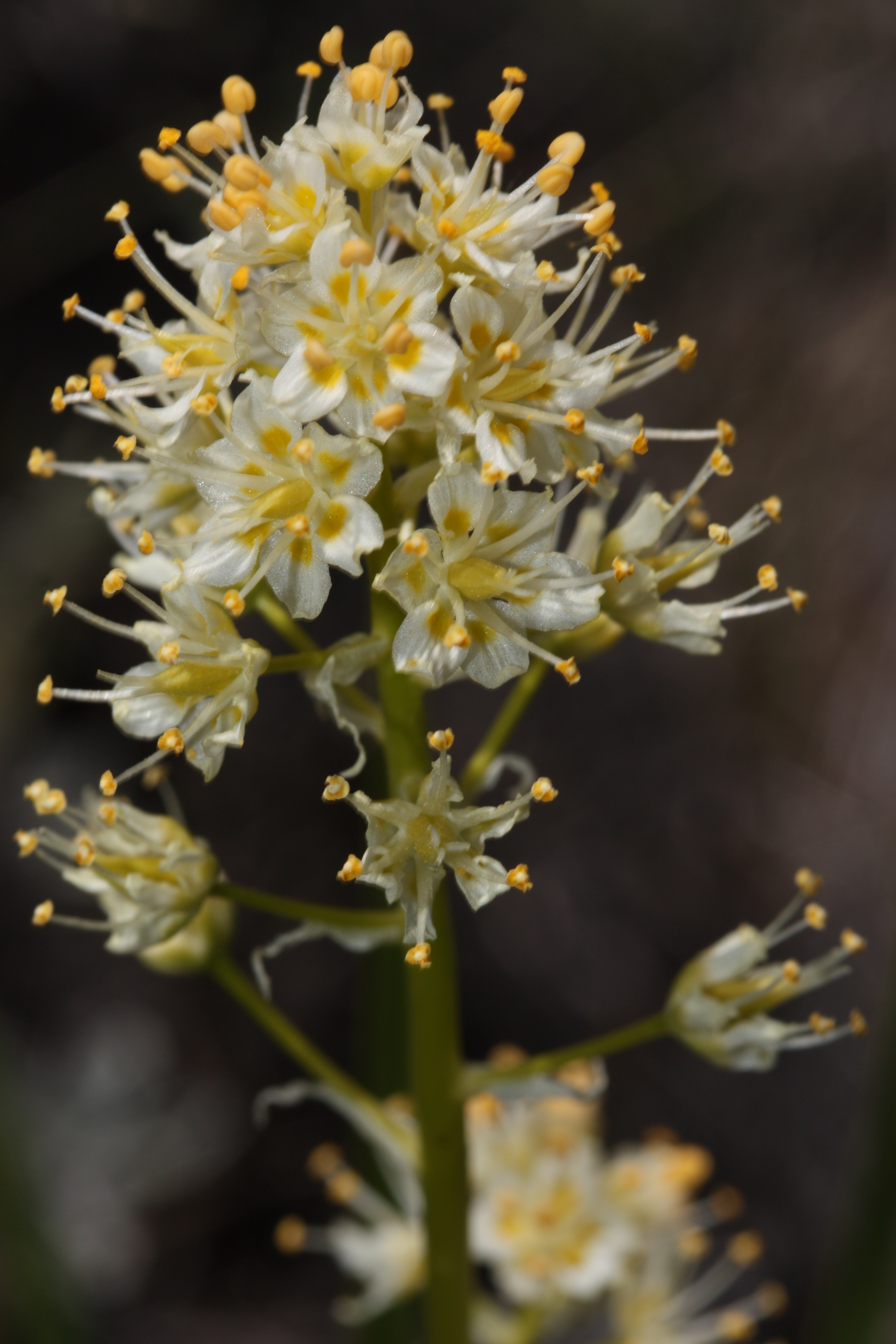
- Toxicoscordion paniculatum

Scientific classification
- Kingdom: Plantae
- Clade: Tracheophytes
- Clade: Angiosperms
- Clade: Monocots
- Order: Liliales
- Family: Melanthiaceae
- Tribe: Melanthieae
- Genus: Toxicoscordion; Rydb.

Synonyms
- Chitonia Salisb. 1866, illegitimate homonym, not D.Don 1823 (Melastomataceae) nor DC. 1824 (Zygophyllaceae)

= Toxicoscordion =

Genus of plants

Toxicoscordion is a genus of flowering plants in the family Melanthiaceae, tribe Melanthieae, first described as a genus in 1903. The genus is mainly distributed in the midwestern United States and western North America, with some species in western Canada and northern Mexico.

Molecular phylogenetic studies in the 21st century have resulted in number of changes to placements within this tribe. Toxicoscordion was long submerged into the genus Zigadenus, but its separate position in the phylogeny of the Melanthieae has been confirmed. Members of Toxicoscordion may also be distinguished from other similar members of the deathcamas tribe by the presence of narrow, clawed tepals with a single, conspicuous, rounded gland.

All parts of the plants are poisonous causing neurological and cardiac symptoms. Following the eating of a plant part there is a burning sensation in the mouth that only lasts a short time. Several hours later other digestive symptoms develop including watering of the mouth, vomiting, and diarrhea. These are accompanied by a tingling sensation in the skin. Other frequent symptoms include headache, reduction of vision, and muscular weakness. In severe cases there may be heart beat irregularities, abnormal blood pressure, coma, or convulsions, potentially followed by death. Patients are supported with fluid replacement, assistance in breathing if difficulty develops, and medication to manage blood pressure. When patients survive they generally have a complete recovery within twenty-four hours.

Species

Image	Scientific name	Common name	Distribution
	Toxicoscordion brevibracteatum (syn. Zigadenus brevibracteatus)	desert deathcamas	Baja California, Sonora, California
	Toxicoscordion exaltatum (syn. Zigadenus exaltatus)	giant deathcamas	California, Nevada
	Toxicoscordion fontanum (syn. Zigadenus fontanus)	smallflower deathcamas	California
	Toxicoscordion fremontii (syn. Zigadenus fremontii)	Frèmont's deathcamas, star zigadene (several varieties)	Baja California, Oregon, California
	Toxicoscordion micranthum (syn. Zigadenus micranthus)	smallflower deathcamas	Oregon, California
	Toxicoscordion nuttallii (syn. Zigadenus nuttallii)	Nuttall's deathcamas	SC United States
	Toxicoscordion paniculatum (syn. Zigadenus paniculatus)	foothill deathcamas, sand-corn	W United States
	Toxicoscordion venenosum (syn. Zigadenus venenosus)	death camas, meadow deathcamas	W Canada, W USA, Baja California
