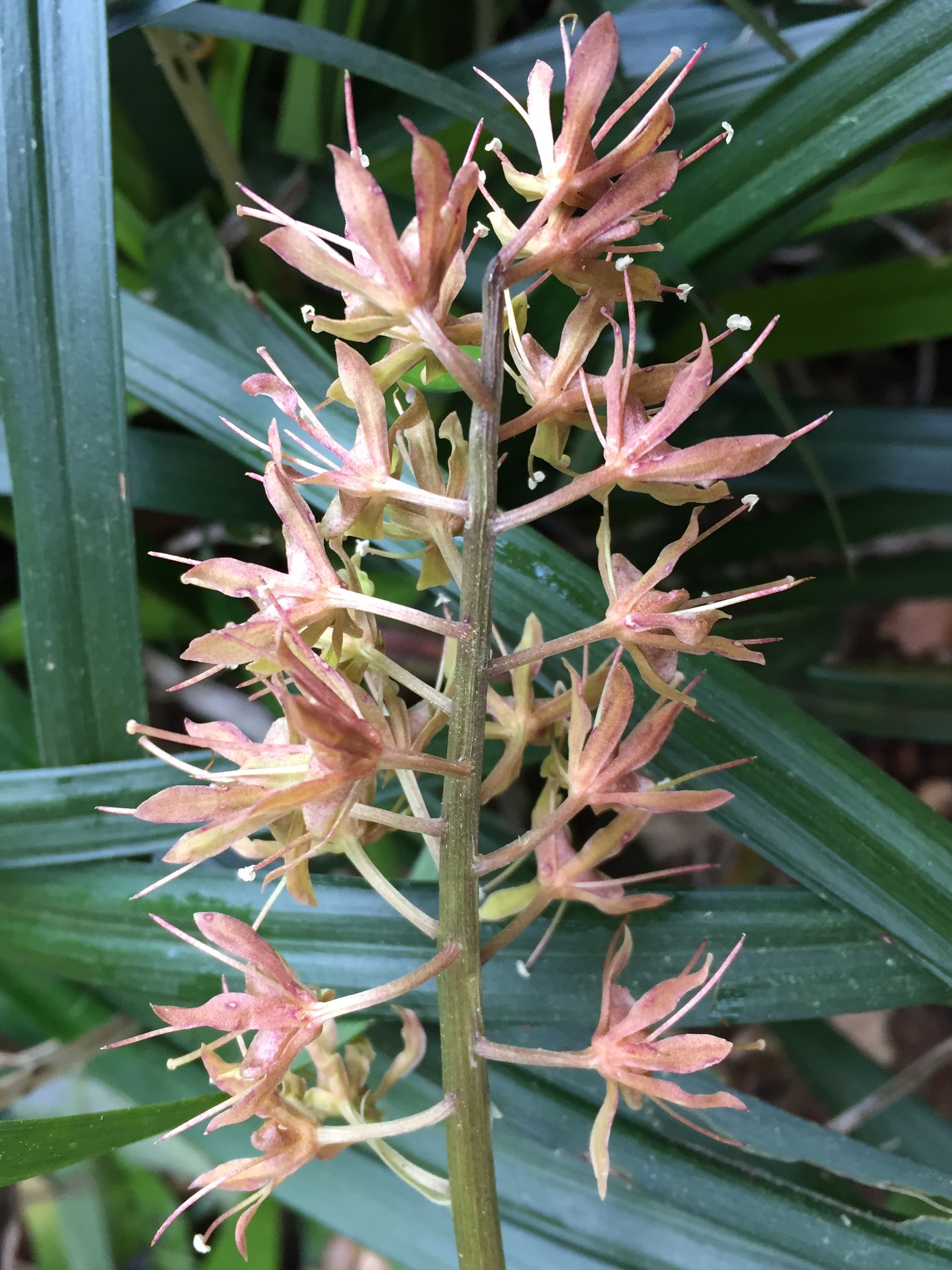
- Ypsilandra thibetica

Scientific classification
- Kingdom: Plantae
- Clade: Tracheophytes
- Clade: Angiosperms
- Clade: Monocots
- Order: Liliales
- Family: Melanthiaceae
- Tribe: Heloniadeae
- Genus: Ypsilandra; Franch.

Type species
- Ypsilandra thibetica Franch.

= Ypsilandra =

Genus of flowering plants

Ypsilandra is a genus of at least six herbaceous plant species, first described as a genus in 1888. This genus is a member of the Melanthiaceae and is native to East Asia (China, the Himalayas, Myanmar, Thailand).

Ypsilandra species are perennial plants that grow from thick rhizomes. They are associated with sloping, forested habitats. They are very infrequently cultivated in the West. Their leaves are generally long and thin, growing in a rosette from the base of the plant. Ypsilandra species produce flowers on a long scape arising from the intersection of the leaves and the stem. The inflorescences consist of a cluster of nodding, radially-symmetrical tube-shaped flowers with six tepals. The stamens protrude beyond the tepals. Depending on the species, the tepals may be white, pink, purple, or yellow.

Species

- Ypsilandra alpina F.T.Wang & Tang - Tibet, Yunnan, N Myanmar
- Ypsilandra cavaleriei H.Lév. & Vaniot - Guangdong, Guangxi, Guizhou, Hunan
- Ypsilandra jinpingensis W.H.Chen, Y.M.Shui & ZhiY.Yu - Yunnan, N Vietnam
- Ypsilandra kansuensis R.N.Zhao & Z.X.Peng - Gansu
- Ypsilandra thibetica Franch. - Sichuan, Hunan, Guangxi, Taiwan
- Ypsilandra yunnanensis W.W.Sm. & Jeffrey - Nepal, Yunnan, Bhutan, Assam, Myanmar

Ypsilandra thibetica is used in traditional Chinese medicine, especially in Sichuan and Yunnan provinces, as a haemostatic.

== Gallery ==
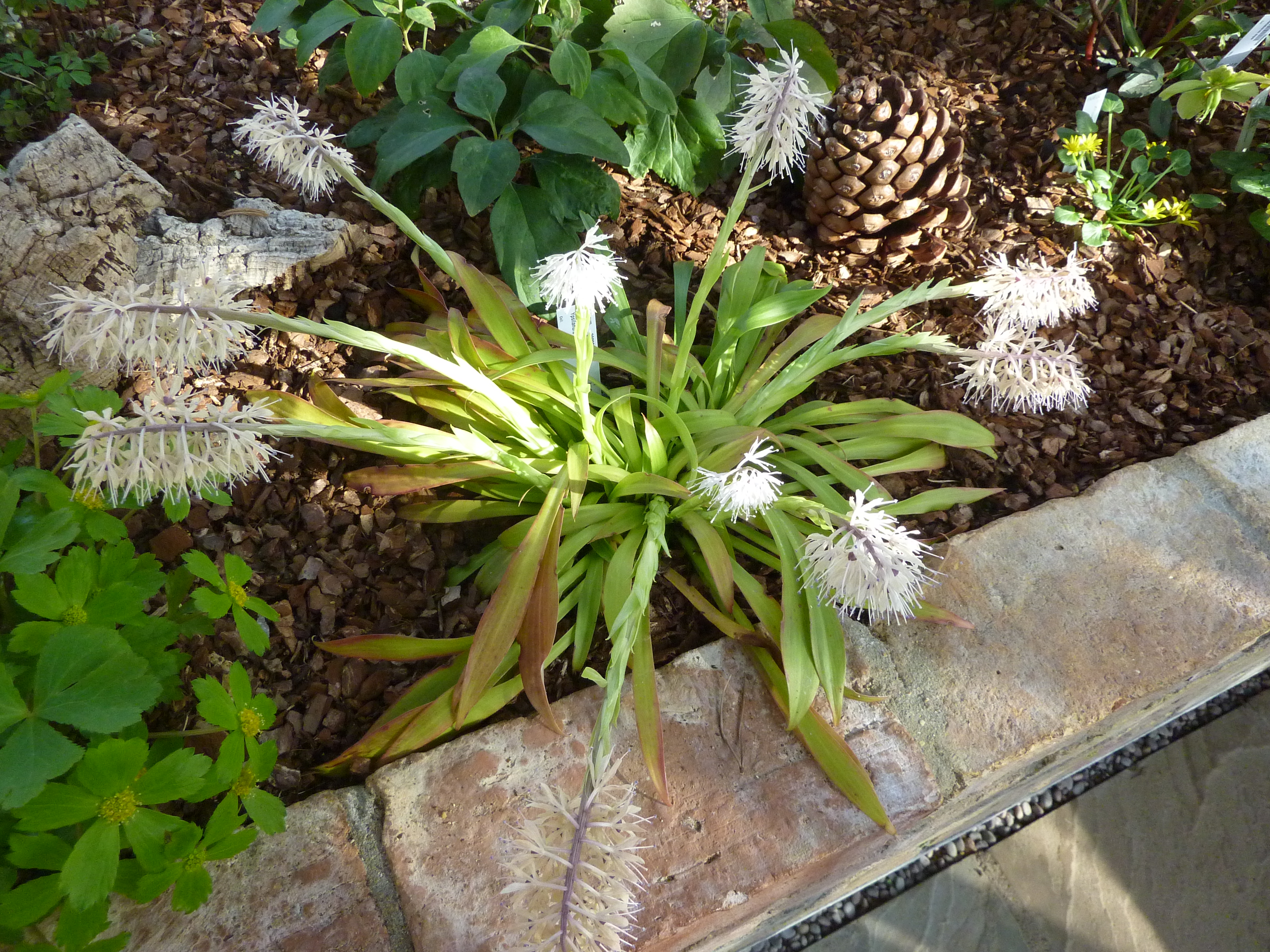
Ypsilandra thibetica cultivated plant of a white-flowered form growing in Cambridge Botanic Gardens, Cambridgeshire, United Kingdom.

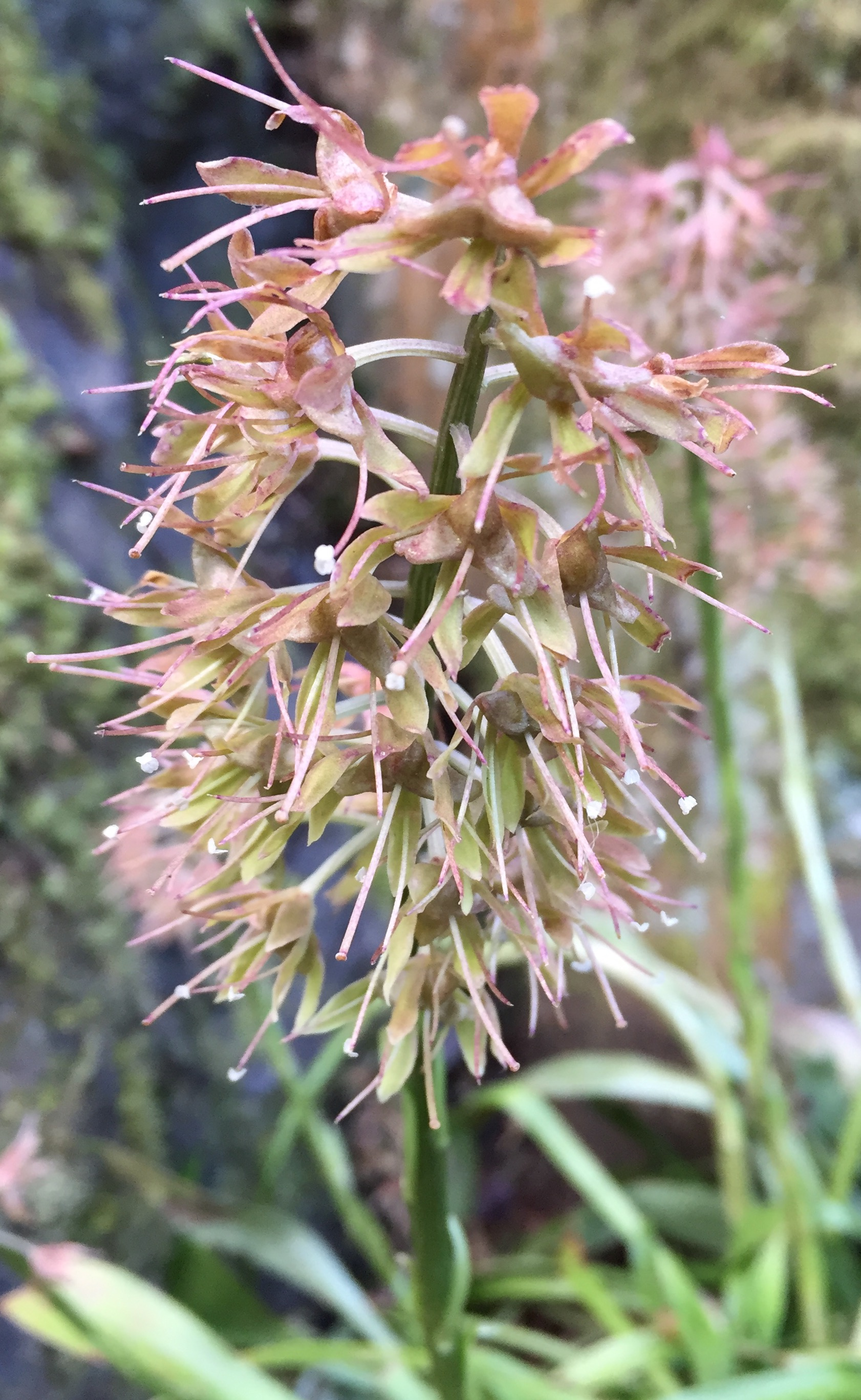
Ypsilandra thibetica frontal close-up of inflorescence of a pink-flowered form, showing interiors of flowers with gynoecium and androecium. Cultivated plant, RHS Rosemoor garden, Devon, U.K.
