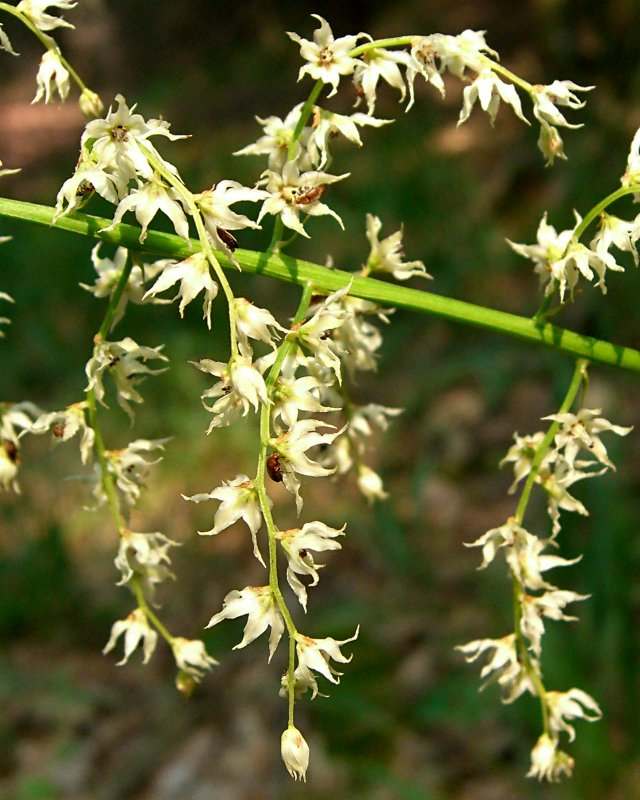
- Flowers of Stenanthium gramineum

Scientific classification
- Kingdom: Plantae
- Clade: Tracheophytes
- Clade: Angiosperms
- Clade: Monocots
- Order: Liliales
- Family: Melanthiaceae
- Tribe: Melanthieae
- Genus: Stenanthium (A.Gray) Kunth

Synonyms
- Oceanoros Small; Tracyanthus Small

= Stenanthium =

Genus of flowering plants

Stenanthium is a North American genus of flowering plants in the tribe Melanthieae of the family Melanthiaceae.

Featherbells is a common name for plants in this genus.

== Taxonomy ==
Molecular phylogenetic studies in the 21st century have resulted in number of changes to placements within this tribe.

Three species were removed from the genus to Anticlea and two or three (depending on whether S. leimanthoides is maintained as a separate species) added from Zigadenus sensu lato, the deathcamases. (See also Phylogeny of Melanthieae.) Members of Stenanthium, as currently circumscribed, may also be distinguished from other deathcamases by having a slender cylindrical bulb and the lack of sarcotesta on its brown seeds. They occur in the eastern and south-central United States.

=== Species ===
Species include:

Image	Scientific name	Common name	Distribution
	Stenanthium densum (Desr.) Zomlefer & Judd	Osceola's plume	southeastern United States from Texas to Virginia
	Stenanthium diffusum Wofford		Tennessee
	Stenanthium gramineum (Ker Gawl.) Morong	eastern featherbells	eastern + south-central United States from eastern Texas to Florida north to Michigan and Connecticut.
	Stenanthium leimanthoides (A.Gray) Zomlefer & Judd	pine barren deathcamas	eastern + south-central United States from eastern Texas to Florida north to New York
	Stenanthium macrum Sorrie & Weakley		Gulf Coast, from Texas to Florida
	Stenanthium occidentale A.Gray	western featherbells	native to the Pacific Northwest, the Klamath Mountains in northwestern California, and Western Canada.
	Stenanthium tennesseense Sorrie & Weakley		southern Tennessee

Different botanists and sources recognize different numbers of distinct species. The Flora of North America and USDA recognize two: Stenanthium gramineum and Stenanthium occidentale. Several sources recognize S. leimanthoides as a separate species. The World Checklist of Selected Plant Families recognized three species in 2013, treating S. leimanthoides as a synonym of S. densum. Plants of the World Online treats S. occidentale as a synonym of Anticlea occidentale. Research by Sorrie and Weakley (2017) described two new species of Stenanthium in the southeastern United States: S. macrum and S. tennesseense.

== See also ==
- Melanthiaceae genera
