= Anticlea occidentalis =

Scientific classification
- Kingdom: Plantae
- Clade: Tracheophytes
- Clade: Angiosperms
- Clade: Monocots
- Order: Liliales
- Family: Melanthiaceae
- Genus: Anticlea
- Species: A. occidentalis

Binomial name
- Anticlea occidentalis (A.Gray) Zomlefer & Judd

Species of plant

Anticlea occidentalis is a species in the Melanthiaceae (bunchflower) family with the common names bronze-bells or western featherbells. It is found in mountains in the Pacific Northwest region of North America.
