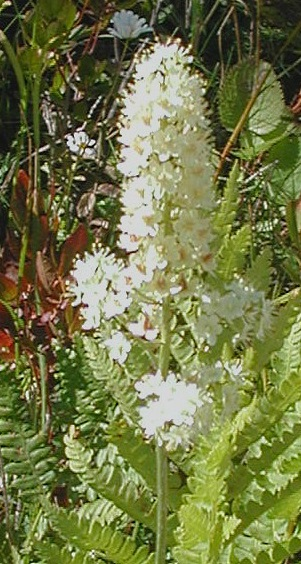
- Stenanthium densum flowers

Scientific classification
- Kingdom: Plantae
- Clade: Tracheophytes
- Clade: Angiosperms
- Clade: Monocots
- Order: Liliales
- Family: Melanthiaceae
- Genus: Stenanthium
- Species: S. densum

Binomial name
- Stenanthium densum (Desr.) Zomlefer & Judd

Synonyms
- Many, including: Amianthium leimanthoides A.Gray; Melanthium densum Desr.; Stenanthium leimanthoides (A.Gray) Zomlefer & Judd; Zigadenus densus (Desr.) Fernald; Zigadenus leimanthoides (A.Gray) A.Gray

= Stenanthium densum =

Species of wildflower

Stenanthium densum is a poisonous but spectacular monocot wildflower native to pine barrens of the eastern United States. It is known variously as Osceola's plume, crowpoison, or black snakeroot. Stenanthium leimanthoides is either treated as a synonym of this species or as a separate species. It is native to the southernmost Gulf Coast, from eastern Louisiana east, down through most of Florida, and to the easternmost Atlantic Coast north to Rhode Island, seldom far from the coast.

Within the family Melanthiaceae, it is placed in the tribe Melanthieae. Molecular phylogenetic studies in the 21st century have resulted in substantial rearrangement of the species in this tribe, many being moved to different genera. S. densum was previously placed in Zigadenus as Z. densum, and will be found under this name in older sources.

== See also ==
- Osceola
