= Anticlea volcanica =

Scientific classification
- Kingdom: Plantae
- Clade: Tracheophytes
- Clade: Angiosperms
- Clade: Monocots
- Order: Liliales
- Family: Melanthiaceae
- Genus: Anticlea
- Species: A. volcanica

Binomial name
- Anticlea volcanica (Benth.) Baker

Species of plant

Anticlea volcanica is a herbaceous perennial plant belonging to the family Melanthiaceae natively occurring from central Mexico to Guatemala.
