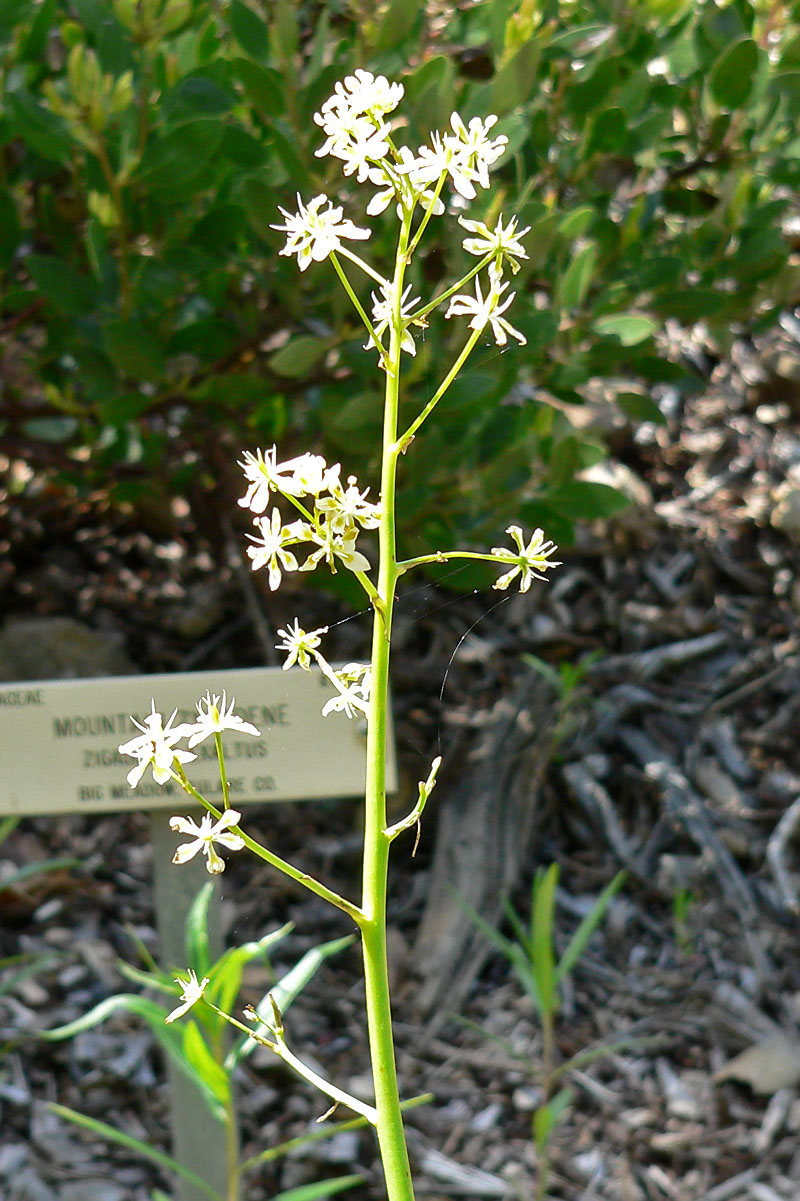

Scientific classification
- Kingdom: Plantae
- Clade: Tracheophytes
- Clade: Angiosperms
- Clade: Monocots
- Order: Liliales
- Family: Melanthiaceae
- Genus: Toxicoscordion
- Species: T. exaltatum

Binomial name
- Toxicoscordion exaltatum (Eastw.) A.Heller

Synonyms
- Zigadenus exaltatus Eastw.; Zygadenus exaltatus Eastw., alternate spelling

= Toxicoscordion exaltatum =

Giant deathcamas

Species of plant

Toxicoscordion exaltatum the giant deathcamas, is a North American flowering plant in the genus Toxicoscordion, reputed to be deadly poisonous. It is native to California, Oregon, and Nevada, where it can be found in the Sierra Nevada foothills.
