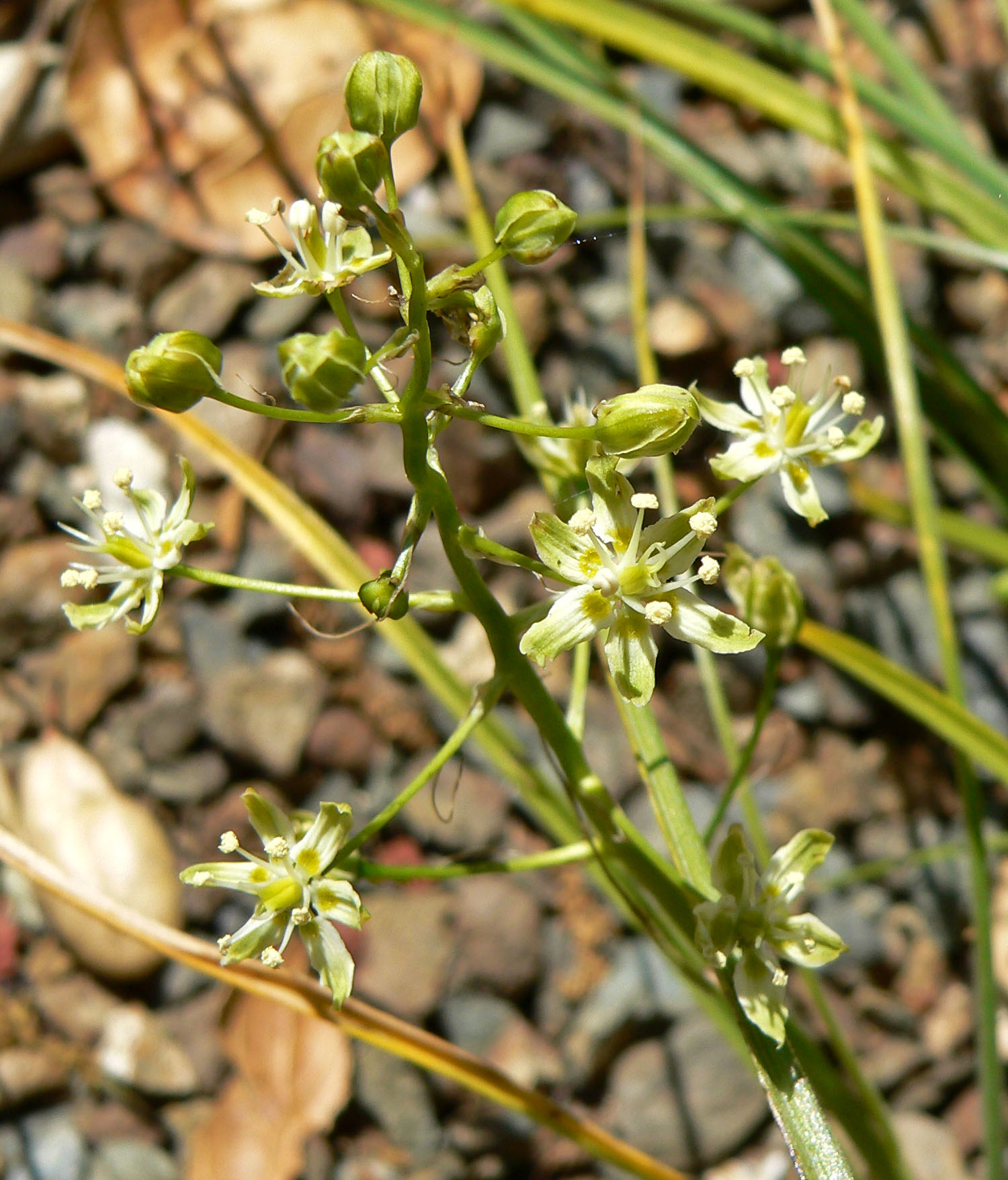
- University of California Botanical Garden, Berkeley

Scientific classification
- Kingdom: Plantae
- Clade: Tracheophytes
- Clade: Angiosperms
- Clade: Monocots
- Order: Liliales
- Family: Melanthiaceae
- Genus: Toxicoscordion
- Species: T. micranthum

Binomial name
- Toxicoscordion micranthum (Eastw.) A.Heller

Synonyms
- Zigadenus micranthus Eastw.; Zygadenus micranthus Eastw., alternate spelling; Zigadenus venenosus var. micranthus (Eastw.) Jeps

= Toxicoscordion micranthum =

Smallflower deathcamas

Species of flowering plant

Toxicoscordion micranthum, the smallflower deathcamas, is a flowering plant in the genus Toxicoscordion. It is native to Oregon and California, primarily in the Coast Ranges from Douglas County to Napa and Sonoma Counties, with isolated populations in Lassen, Plumas, Santa Clara, and San Benito Counties. It is a member of the serpentine soils flora.

Toxicoscordion micranthum is a bulb-forming herb up to 70 cm tall and bearing as many as 60 flowers. Flowers are white or cream-colored, sometimes with green markings, 5–12 mm in diameter hence smaller than most of the other species in the genus.
