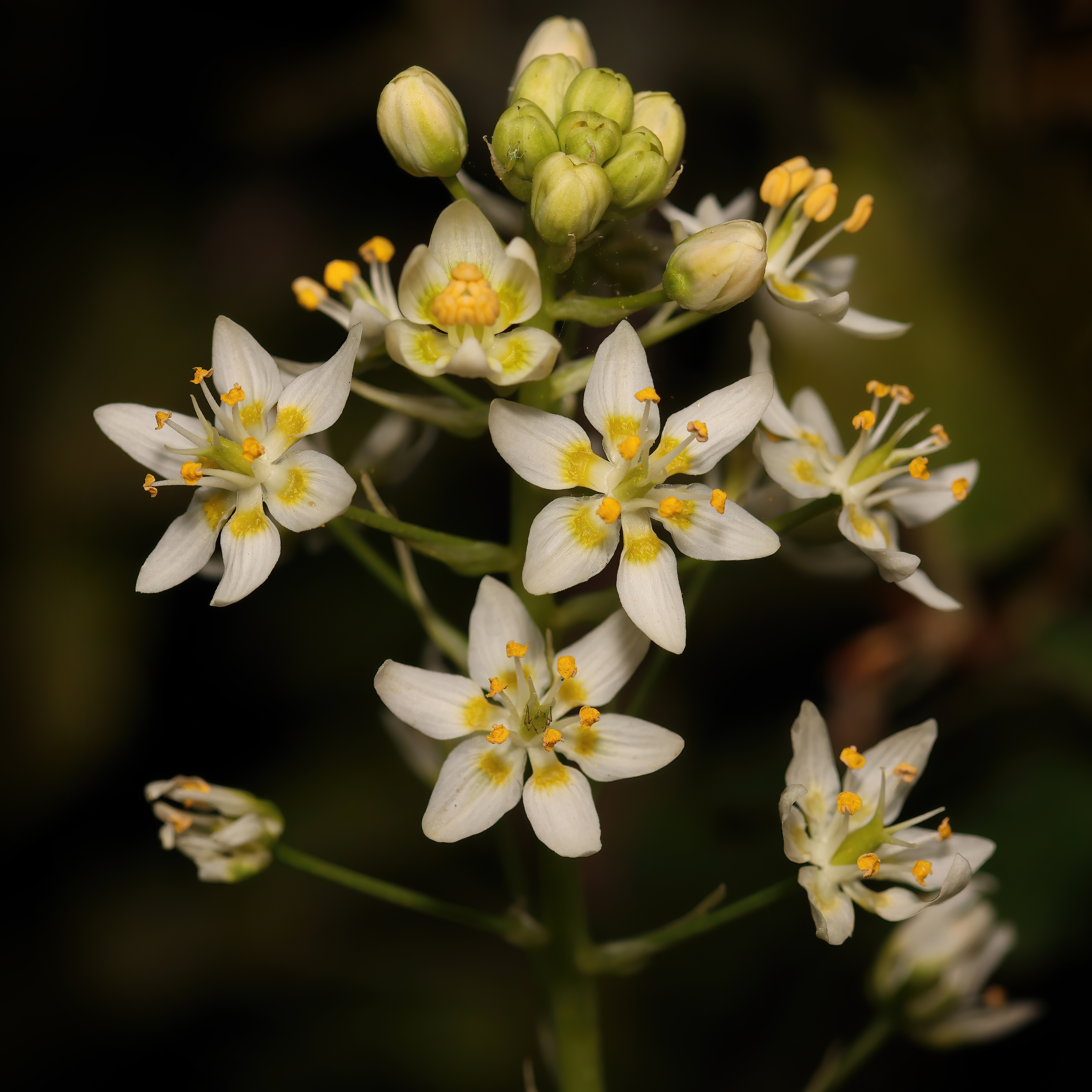
- Common star lily

Scientific classification
- Kingdom: Plantae
- Clade: Embryophytes
- Clade: Tracheophytes
- Clade: Angiosperms
- Clade: Monocots
- Order: Liliales
- Family: Melanthiaceae
- Genus: Toxicoscordion
- Species: T. fremontii

Binomial name
- Toxicoscordion fremontii (Torr.) Rydb.

Synonyms
- Zigadenus fremontii (Torr.) S. Watson; Zygadenus fremontii (Torr.) S. Watson, alternate spelling; Anticlea fremontii Torr.; Zigadenus glaberrimus Hook. & Arn. 1833, illegitimate homonym not Michx. 1803; Zigadenus douglasii Torr.; Zigadenus fremontii var. minor Baker; Toxicoscordion fremontii var. minor (Baker) R.R.Gates; Zigadenus fremontii var. salsus Jeps.; Zigadenus fremontii var. inezianus Jeps.

= Toxicoscordion fremontii =

Species of flowering plant

Toxicoscordion fremontii, known as the common star lily or Frémont's deathcamas (after John C. Frémont) or star zigadene, is an attractive wildflower found on grassy or woody slopes, or rocky outcrops, in many lower-lying regions of California, southwestern Oregon, and northern Baja California.

Like other deathcamases, T. fremontii grows from a more or less spherical bulb, which in this species has a diameter of 20–35 mm. The leaves can reach up to half a meter in length and grow from the base of the plant. Flowers, which can be seen from March to June, grow in clusters. They have six petals (strictly, three petals and three very similar sepals), arranged symmetrically, giving rise to the name star-lily. Each flower is 1–4 cm across.
