= Toxicoscordion fontanum =

Small-flower death camas

Scientific classification
- Kingdom: Plantae
- Clade: Tracheophytes
- Clade: Angiosperms
- Clade: Monocots
- Order: Liliales
- Family: Melanthiaceae
- Genus: Toxicoscordion
- Species: T. fontanum

Binomial name
- Toxicoscordion fontanum (Eastw.) Zomlefer & Judd

Synonyms
- Zigadenus fontanus Eastw.; Zygadenus fontanus Eastw., alternate spelling; Zigadenus micranthus var. fontanus (Eastw.) O.S. Walsh ex McNeal

Species of plant

Toxicoscordion fontanum, common name small-flower death camas, is a rare plant species known only from serpentine marshes in California. It is found primarily in the Coast Ranges from Mendocino County to San Luis Obispo County, with an additional report of an isolated population in the Sierra Nevada foothills in Kern County east of Bakersfield.

Toxicoscordion fontanum is a bulb-forming perennial herb. Bulbs are egg-shaped, up to 40 mm (1.6 inches) long, not clumped together. Inflorescences are paniculate, sometimes with as many as 100 flowers. Tepals are cream-colored, up to 12 mm (0.5 inches) long; filaments shorter than the tepals.

== Toxicity ==
As with many other species formerly included in Zigadenus, this species is highly toxic and potentially lethal to humans and to livestock. Some people have eaten it confusing it with wild onion, Allium spp. Zigadenus, despite Toxicoscordion not having the characteristic onion scent associated with Allium spp.

== Ecology ==
It is not unusual to find species that specialize in growing on serpentine soil. There are scattered pocket of this soil in various parts of California, Oregon, and elsewhere. Metamorphic rocks such as serpentinite are formed well below the earth's surface then carried upward by geologic activity. Soils made from such rocks tend to be low in nutrients such as nitrogen, potassium and phosphorus but high in nickel and chromium. Such conditions are toxic to most plants, but some species such as T. fontanum have evolved with adaptations allowing them to tolerate serpentine soils.
