= Toxicoscordion brevibracteatum =

Conservation status
- Vulnerable (NatureServe)

Scientific classification
- Kingdom: Plantae
- Clade: Tracheophytes
- Clade: Angiosperms
- Clade: Monocots
- Order: Liliales
- Family: Melanthiaceae
- Genus: Toxicoscordion
- Species: T. brevibracteatum

Binomial name
- Toxicoscordion brevibracteatum (M.E.Jones) R.R.Gates

Synonyms
- Zigadenus brevibracteatus (M.E.Jones) H.M.Hall; Zigadenus fremontii var. brevibracteatus M.E.Jones

Species of plant

Toxicoscordion brevibracteatum (syn. Zigadenus brevibracteatus) is a species of flowering plant known by the common name desert deathcamas. It is native to Baja California, Sonora, and California, where it grows in sandy desert habitat among creosote and Joshua trees.

Toxicoscordion brevibracteatum is a perennial wildflower growing from a brown or black bulb up to 4 centimeters long. The stem grows up to 50 or 60 centimeters long. The leaves are linear in shape, measuring up to 30 centimeters long by one wide. Most of the leaves are at the base of the stem and there may be a few reduced leaves above. The inflorescence is an open panicle of flowers at the tips of branches. The flowers are male or bisexual, with six cream-colored tepals. The fruit is a capsule 1 or 2 centimeters long.

Like other members of Toxicoscordion, T. brevibracteatum contains Veratrum alkaloids. This can make it hazardous and potentially lethal to livestock, particularly in the early spring or late winter when other browsing options are sparse.
