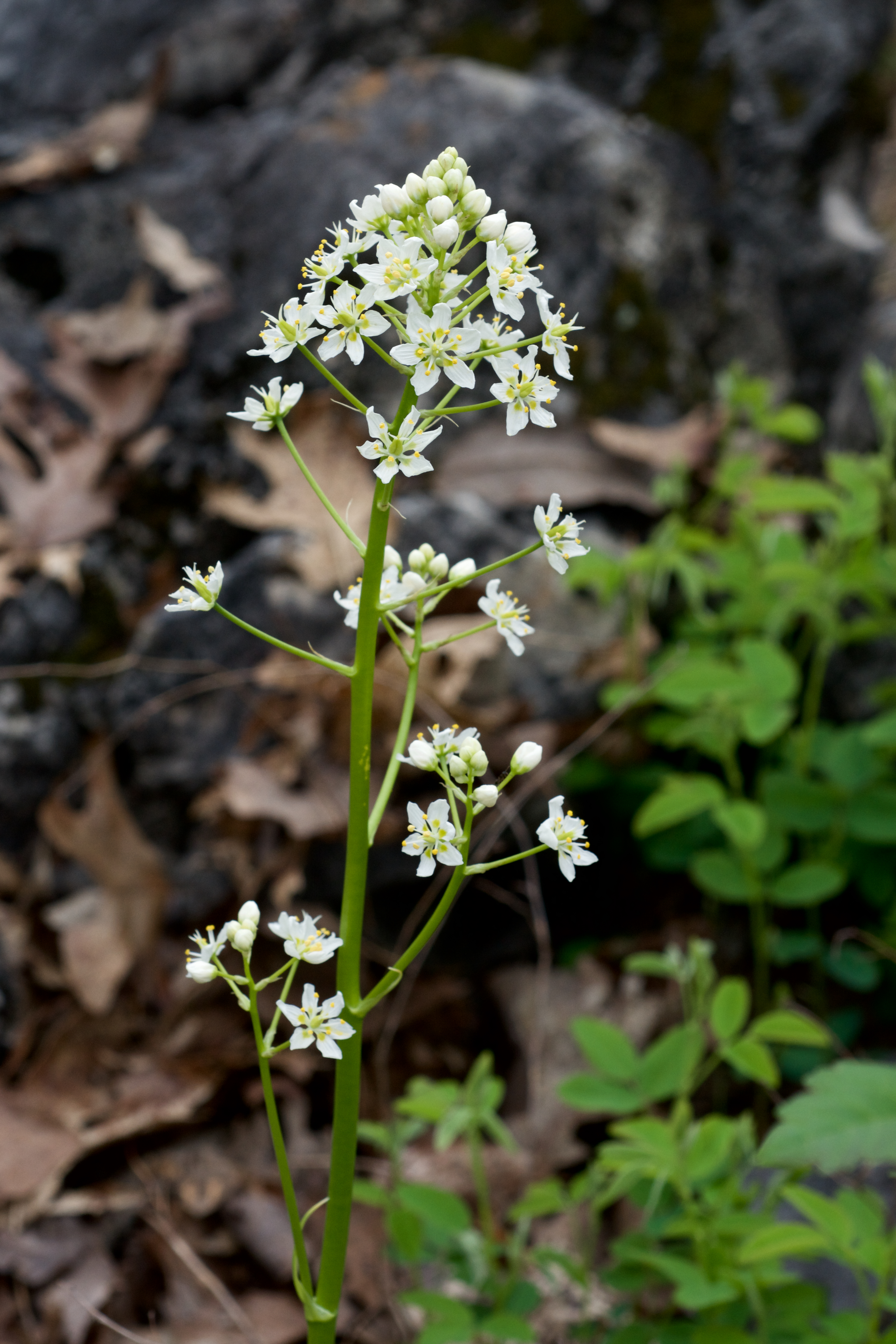

Scientific classification
- Kingdom: Plantae
- Clade: Tracheophytes
- Clade: Angiosperms
- Clade: Monocots
- Order: Liliales
- Family: Melanthiaceae
- Genus: Toxicoscordion
- Species: T. nuttallii

Binomial name
- Toxicoscordion nuttallii (A.Gray) Rydb.

Synonyms
- Amianthium nuttallii A.Gray; Anticlea nuttallii (A.Gray) Torr.; Helonias angustifolia Nutt. 1835, illegitimate homonym not Michx. 1803; Leimanthium nuttallii (A.Gray) Hook.; Melanthium nuttallii (A.Gray) D.Dietr.; Toxicoscordion texense Rydb.; Zigadenus nuttallii (A.Gray) S.Watson; Zigadenus texensis (Rydb.) J.F.Macbr.; Zygadenus nuttallii (A.Gray) S.Watson, alternate spelling; Zygadenus texensis (Rydb.) J.F.Macbr., alternate spelling

= Toxicoscordion nuttallii =

Species of plant

Toxicoscordion nuttallii (Nuttall's death camas, death camas, poison camas, poison sego) is a species of poisonous plant native to the south-central part of the United States (Arkansas, Oklahoma, Tennessee, Missouri, Louisiana, Mississippi, Kansas, and Texas).

Toxicoscordion nuttallii is a bulb-forming herb up to 75 cm tall. One plant can have as many as 60 cream-colored flowers.
