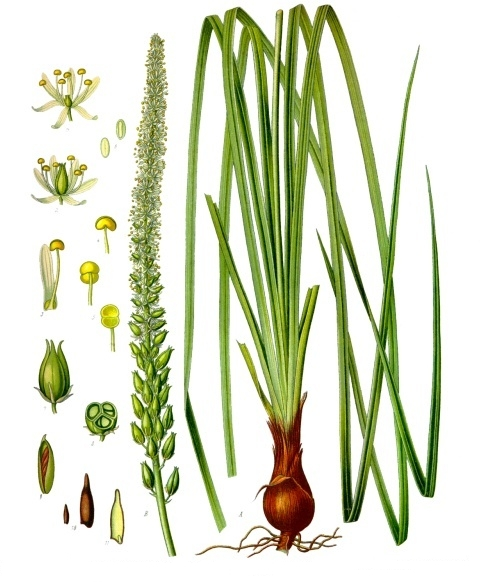
- Schoenocaulon officinale

Scientific classification
- Kingdom: Plantae
- Clade: Embryophytes
- Clade: Tracheophytes
- Clade: Angiosperms
- Clade: Monocots
- Order: Liliales
- Family: Melanthiaceae; Batsch ex Borkh.

Genera
- See text

= Melanthiaceae =

Family of flowering plants

Melanthiaceae, also called the bunchflower family, is a family of flowering herbaceous perennial plants native to the Northern Hemisphere. Along with many other lilioid monocots, early authors considered members of this family to belong to the family Liliaceae, in part because both their sepals and petals closely resemble each other and are often large and showy like those of lilies, while some more recent taxonomists have placed them in a family Trilliaceae. The most authoritative modern treatment, however, the APG III system of 2009 (unchanged from the 2003 APG II system and the 1998 APG system), places the family in the order Liliales, in the clade monocots. Circumscribed in this way, the family includes up to 17 genera.

Familiar members of the family include the genera Paris and Trillium.

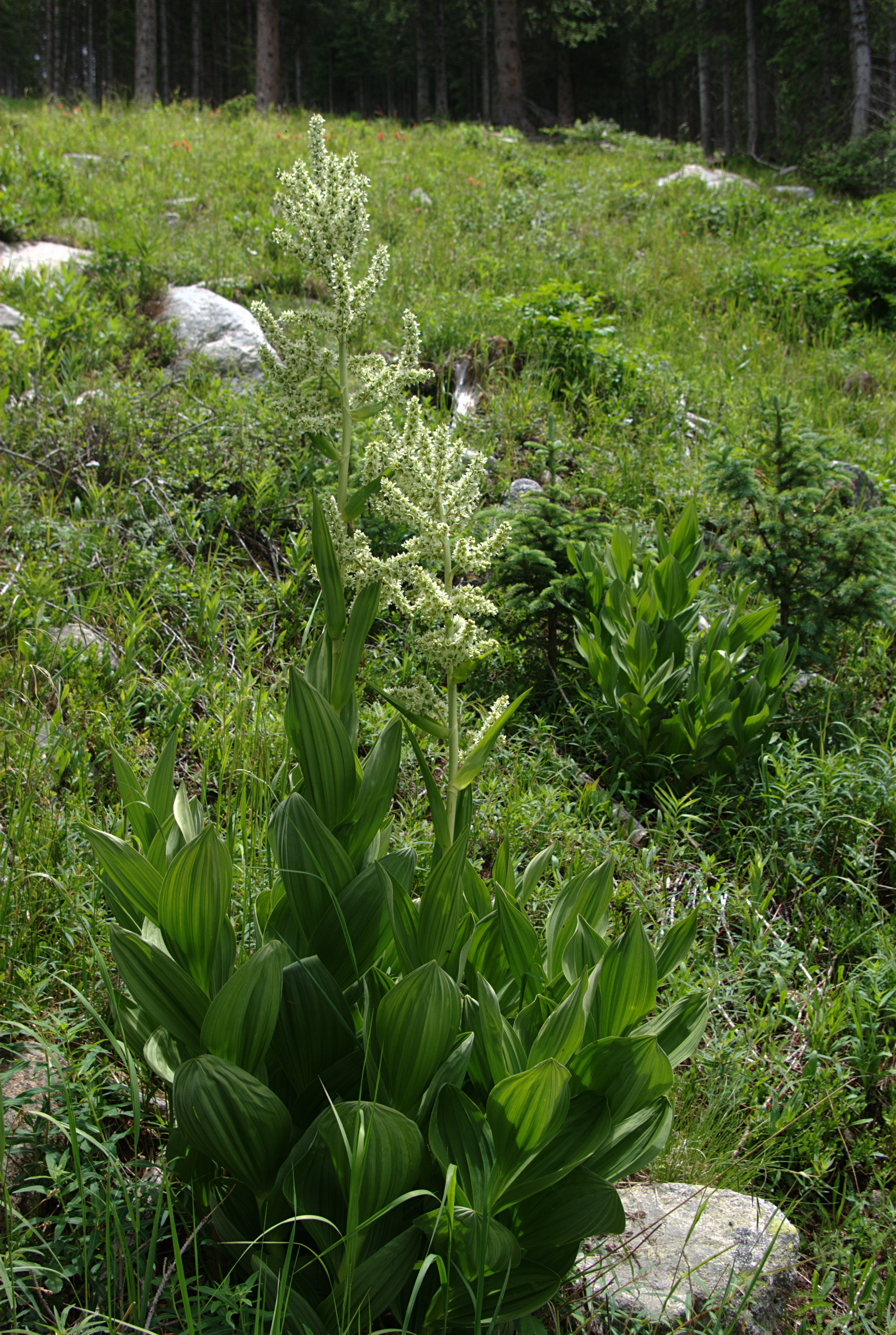
Birth defects in sheep grazing on Veratrum californicum provided key insights into developmental biology in the 20th century.

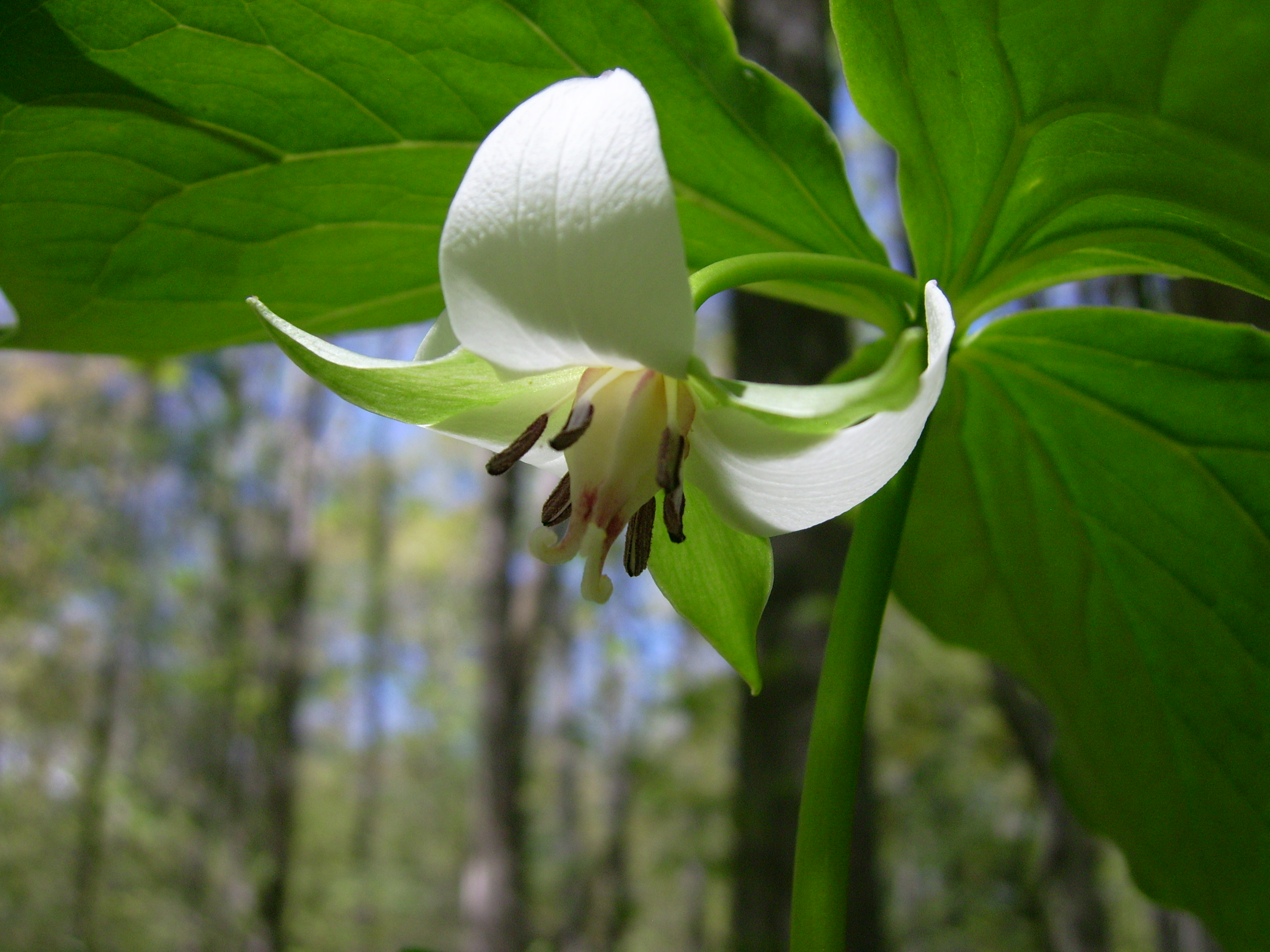
Trilliums (here Trillium cernuum) are fairly common woodland spring ephemerals in temperate North America and Asia.

== Genera and species ==
As of August 2013, the World Checklist of Selected Plant Families accepted 17 genera in the family. They have been divided into five tribes. It has a total of c. 173 known species. Generic assignments within the tribe Melanthieae in particular have been changed radically as a result of molecular phylogenetic studies in the 21st century. Some taxonomists have combined the three genera of Heloniadae into one genus (Helonias).

Heloniadeae

- Helonias L.
- Heloniopsis A.Gray
- Ypsilandra Franch.

Chionographideae

- Chamaelirium Willd., including Chionographis Maxim.

Melanthieae

- Amianthium A.Gray
- Anticlea Kunth
- Melanthium J.Clayton ex L.
- Schoenocaulon A.Gray
- Stenanthium (A.Gray) Kunth
- Toxicoscordion Rydb.
- Veratrum L.
- Zigadenus Michx.

Xerophylleae

- Xerophyllum Michx.

Parideae

- Paris L. (including Daiswa and Kinugasa)
- Pseudotrillium S.B.Farmer
- Trillium L. (including Trillidium)
