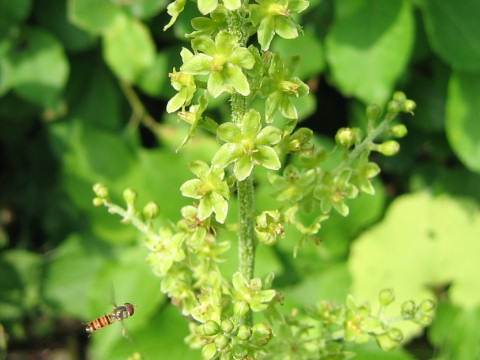
- Melanthium parviflorum

Scientific classification
- Kingdom: Plantae
- Clade: Tracheophytes
- Clade: Angiosperms
- Clade: Monocots
- Order: Liliales
- Family: Melanthiaceae
- Tribe: Melanthieae
- Genus: Melanthium; L.

= Melanthium =

Genus of flowering plants

Melanthium is a genus of herbaceous perennial plants native to North America. They are closely related to Veratrum, and in fact are included in that genus by some authors. The distinction between Melanthium and Veratrum is based on various morphological traits, but it is not yet clear where the line is best drawn.

They contain alkaloids similar to those found in Veratrum and are thus assumed to be poisonous.

== Species ==
The World Checklist considers Melanthium as a synonym of Veratrum, and accepts no species as members of Melanthium. Nor does Plants of the World Online.Tropicos does likewise, adding that proposals have been made to reject the name Melanthium entirely. The Plant List, World Flora Online and Flora of North America, however, do accept the following names in Melanthium:

- Melanthium latifolium or Veratrum hybridum - eastern United States from Connecticut to Alabama and Arkansas
- Melanthium parviflorum or Veratrum parviflorum - southern Appalachians from Virginia to Alabama
- Melanthium virginicum or Veratrum virginicum - eastern United States and Mississippi Valley from New York to Iowa south to Texas and Florida
- Melanthium woodii or Veratrum woodii - central + southeastern United States
