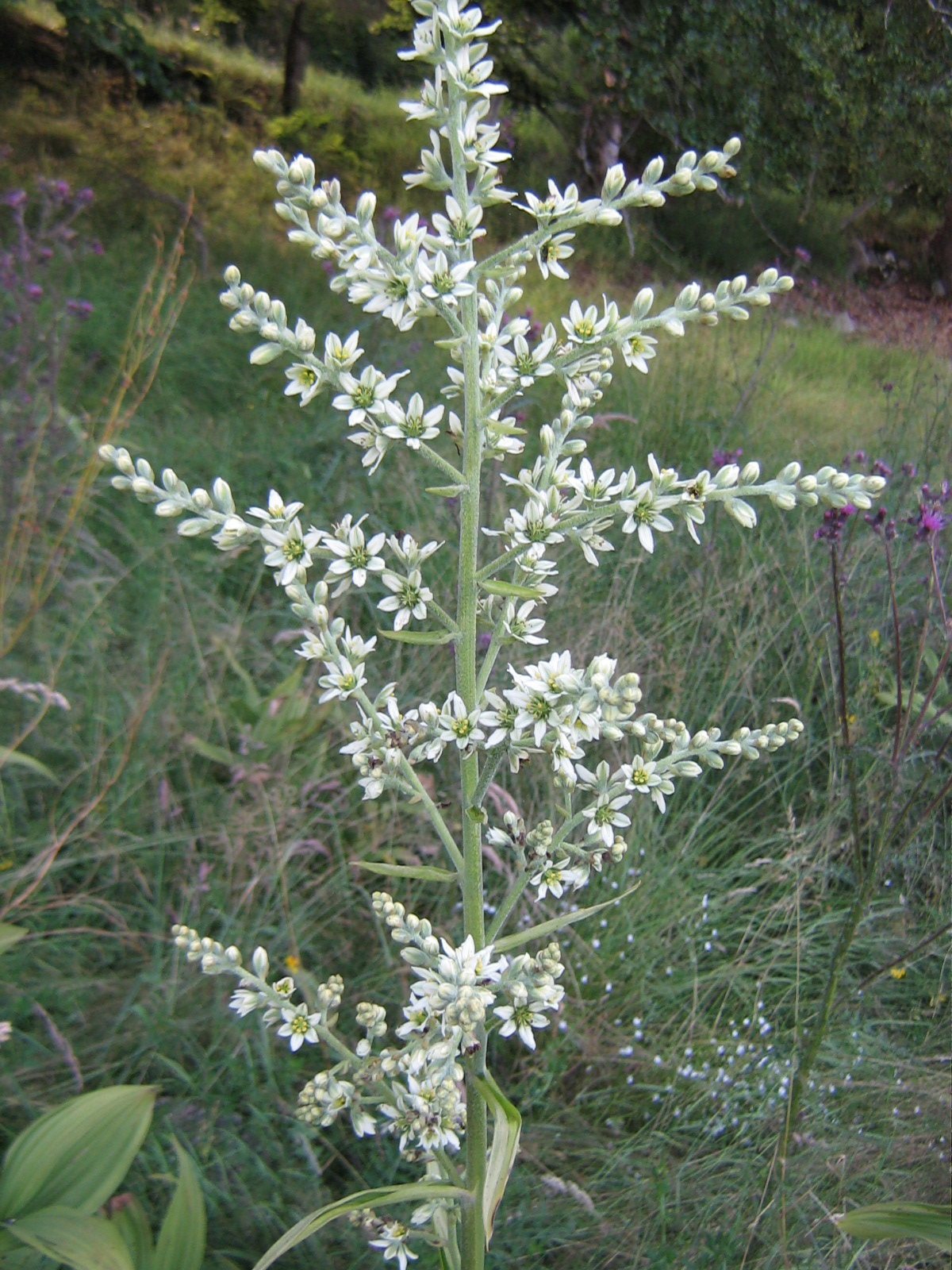

Scientific classification
- Kingdom: Plantae
- Clade: Tracheophytes
- Clade: Angiosperms
- Clade: Monocots
- Order: Liliales
- Family: Melanthiaceae
- Genus: Veratrum
- Species: V. album

Binomial name
- Veratrum album L.

= Veratrum album =

Species of plant

Veratrum album, the false helleborine, white hellebore, European white hellebore, or white veratrum (syn. Veratrum lobelianum Bernh.) is a poisonous plant in the family Melanthiaceae. It is native to Europe and parts of western Asia (western Siberia, Turkey, Caucasus).

== Description ==
Veratrum album is a tall herbaceous perennial plant with alternate, pleated leaves. The flowers are white, marked with green on the top portion of the stalk. The fruit is a small pod containing winged seeds. The stout, simple stems are 50–175 cm (20–69 in) tall. The plants have an estimated lifespan of several centuries and often achieve dominance in wild areas as they are unpalatable to grazing herbivores.

== Uses ==
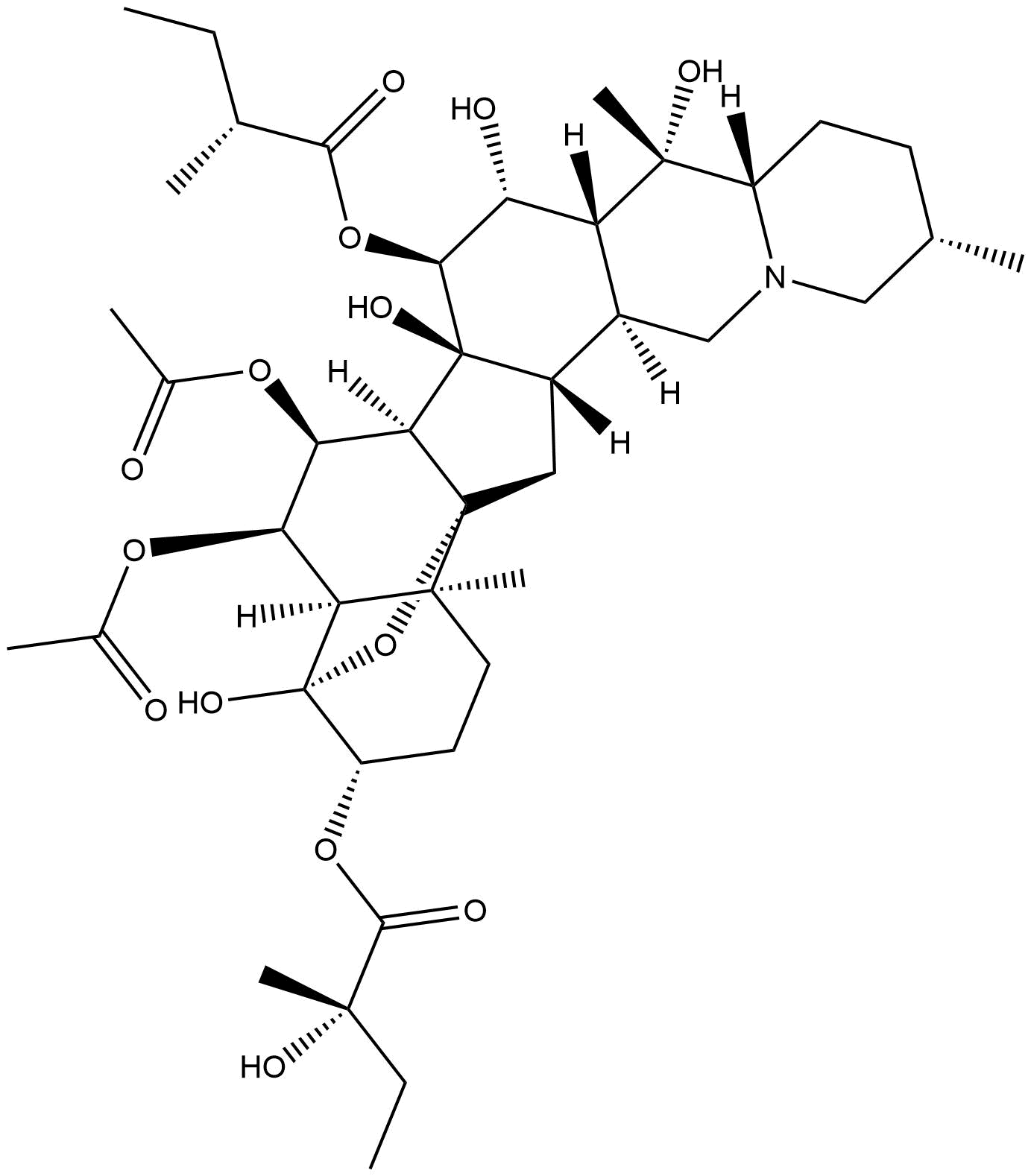
Protoveratrine A

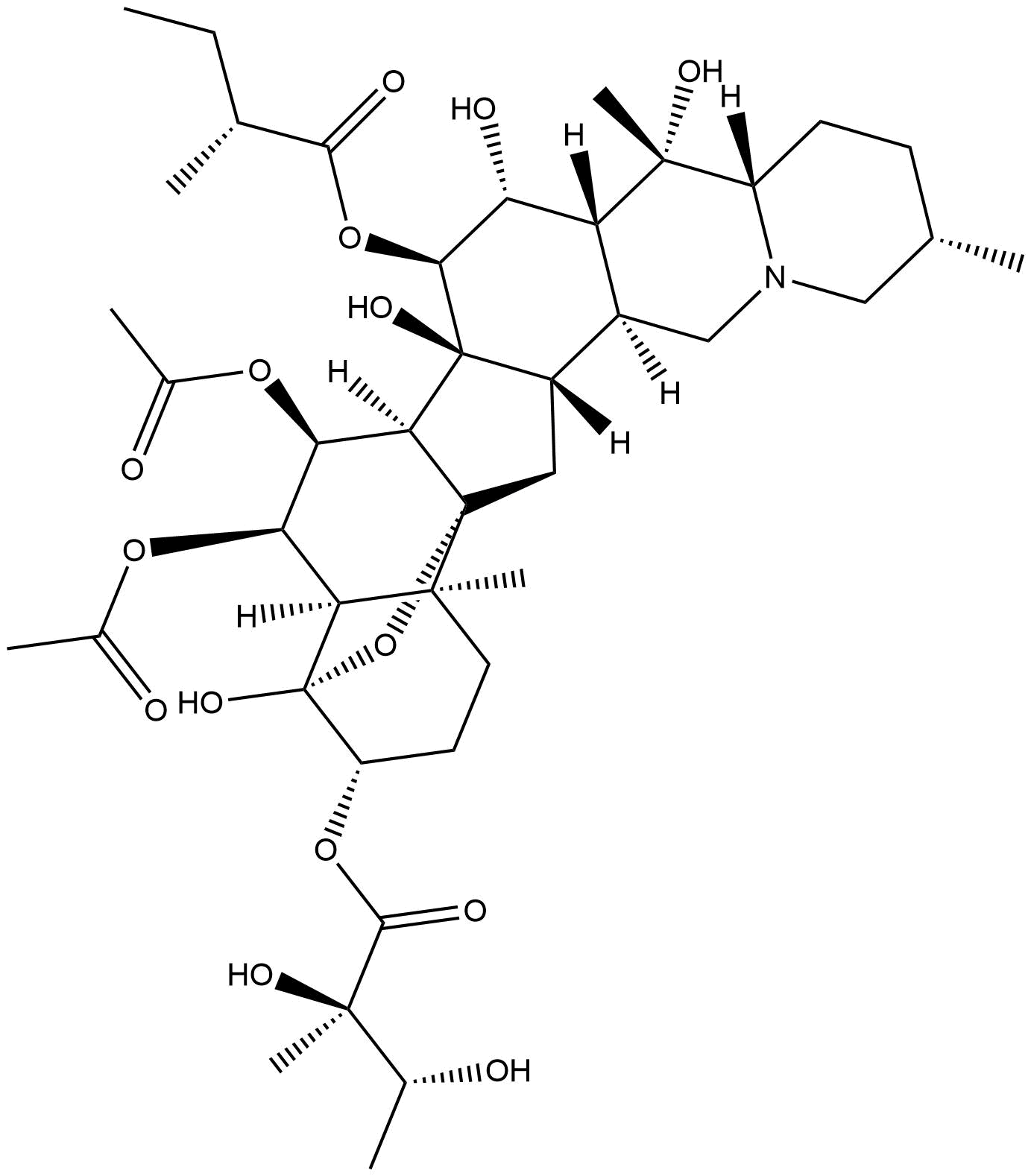
Protoveratrine B

Extracts from dried rhizomes of Veratrum album were briefly used as a pesticide against the Colorado potato beetle.

=== Research ===
In 1890, Georg Salzberger first isolated and named the alkaloid protoveratrine. Later investigation found that protoveratrine is a mixture of two closely related alkaloids, protoveratrine A and protoveratrine B. During the 1940s and 1950s, Veratrum album was studied in essential hypertension, hypertension during renal dysfunction, and pre-eclampsia.

=== Horticultural ===
Veratrum album is grown as an ornamental plant. In the UK, it has gained the Royal Horticultural Society's Award of Garden Merit.

== Toxicity ==
In beverages, V. album has been mistaken for the harmless yellow gentian (Gentiana lutea) or wild garlic (Allium ursinum), resulting in poisoning. All parts of the plant are poisonous.

=== Symptoms ===
Symptoms of Veratrum alkaloid poisoning typically occur within thirty minutes to four hours of ingestion, and include:

- vomiting
- abdominal pain
- hypotension
- bradycardia
- nausea
- drowsiness
- dizziness
- dilated pupils

=== Treatment ===
Treatment for Veratrum alkaloid poisoning include supportive care and symptomatic treatments, such as fluid replacement and anti-emetics. Atropine and vasopressors act to combat bradycardia and hypotension. Duration of illness can last up to ten days but full recovery is possible within a few hours depending on dose and treatment.

=== Poisonings ===
Various Veratrum alkaloids were present in a German sneezing powder in 1982, resulting in the accidental poisoning of those who used it. Sneezing powders are commonly used to prank others. In 1983, there were nine cases of accidental poisoning as a result of these pranks due to the presence of Veratrum alkaloids in the sneezing powders. The victims were nine boys aged between 11 and 18 years old in Scandinavian countries who used supplies imported from the Federal Republic of Germany. All boys had inhaled the powder and six had ingested it. Symptoms typically presented within an hour, after which calls were made to authorities. After sneezing, the victims began to develop gastrointestinal disturbances such as vomiting in all cases and epigastric pain in two. Three of the children collapsed due to low blood pressure prior to being admitted to hospital. Seven of the children had significantly decreased blood pressure and five have cases of sinus bradycardia with no other irregularities. Half of those who had ingested the powder were treated with gastric lavage. Four of the boys were given atropine to combat bradycardia and one was given activated charcoal. Atropine normalised their heart rates within minutes but did little to assist with low blood pressure. In all cases, the patients recovered within twenty-four hours.

In 2005 and 2008, there were three reported cases of accidental poisoning. In 2009, eleven children, aged 8 to 12 years old, accidentally ingested Veratrum album at a youth camp where they had prepared homemade tea using fresh herbs. Two children remained asymptomatic, nine developed mild gastrointestinal symptoms, six presented neurological symptoms, and three showed bradycardia; after medical care, all children recovered. Four cases of accidental poisoning were reported in 2010 after Veratrum album was mistaken for wild garlic and used in self prepared-salad and soups. All victims developed nausea, vomiting, abdominal pain, sinus bradycardia, and hypotension. Complete recovery took between twenty-four and forty-eight hours.

=== Alexander the Great ===
A debate amongst historians is centred around the cause of death of Alexander the Great. Some believe the Macedonian king died of natural causes and others believe he was poisoned. The Romance suggests that his inner circle conspired to assassinate him upon his return to Babylon. A theory proposed by Schep in 2013 suggests that Veratrum album was used to kill Alexander the Great. Schep argues that the usual suspects thought to be the culprit, such as arsenic and strychnine, would have acted too quickly to correlate with historical accounts. Alexander was ill for twelve days and suffered symptoms synonymous with Veratrum album poisoning. Notably, the theory is furthered by the proposal that Alexander drank wine poisoned with Veratrum album. Accounts from Diodorus detail that the king was struck with pain after drinking a large bowl of unmixed wine in honor of Hercules.

=== In vitro mechanism ===
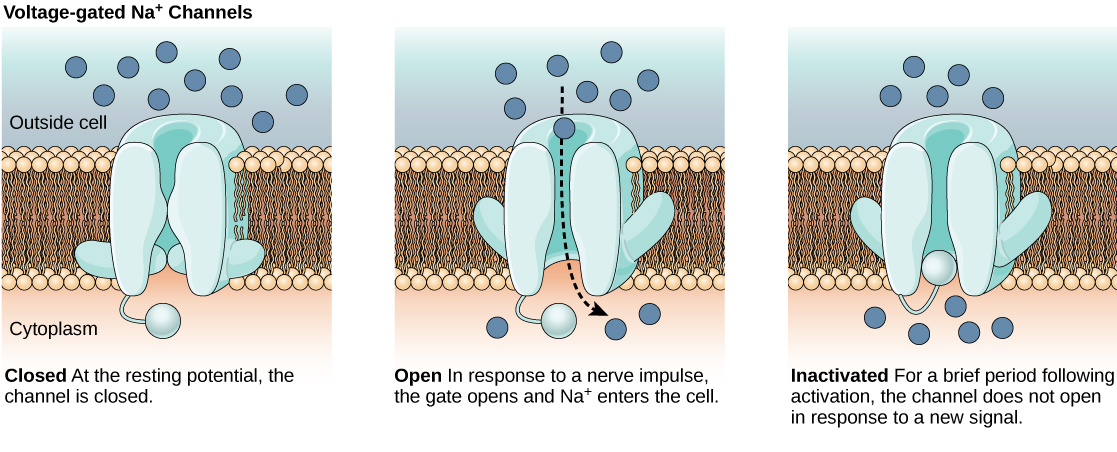
Sodium ion channel

Veratrum album contains over fifty steroidal alkaloids called 'Veratrum alkaloids', including O-acetyljervine, cevadine, cryptenamine, cyclopamine (11-deoxojervine), cycloposine, germitrine, germidine, jervine, muldamine, protoveratrine (A&B), veratramine, veratridine, and veriloid. Some of the principal toxins have a modified steroid template while others differ in their esterified acid moieties. In general, Veratrum alkaloids act by increasing the permeability of the sodium channels of nerve cells, causing them to fire continuously. Increased stimulation, associated with the vagus nerve, results in the Bezold-Jarisch reflex: hypotension, bradycardia and apnoea.

The neurotoxicity of Veratrum alkaloids derives from their effect on the sodium ion channels of nerve cells. They activate receptor site 2 of the voltage-dependent Na^{+} channel in membranes by prolonging its open state. The alkaloids depolarize nerves by enhancing exchange of Na^{+} and K^{+} across the membrane.
