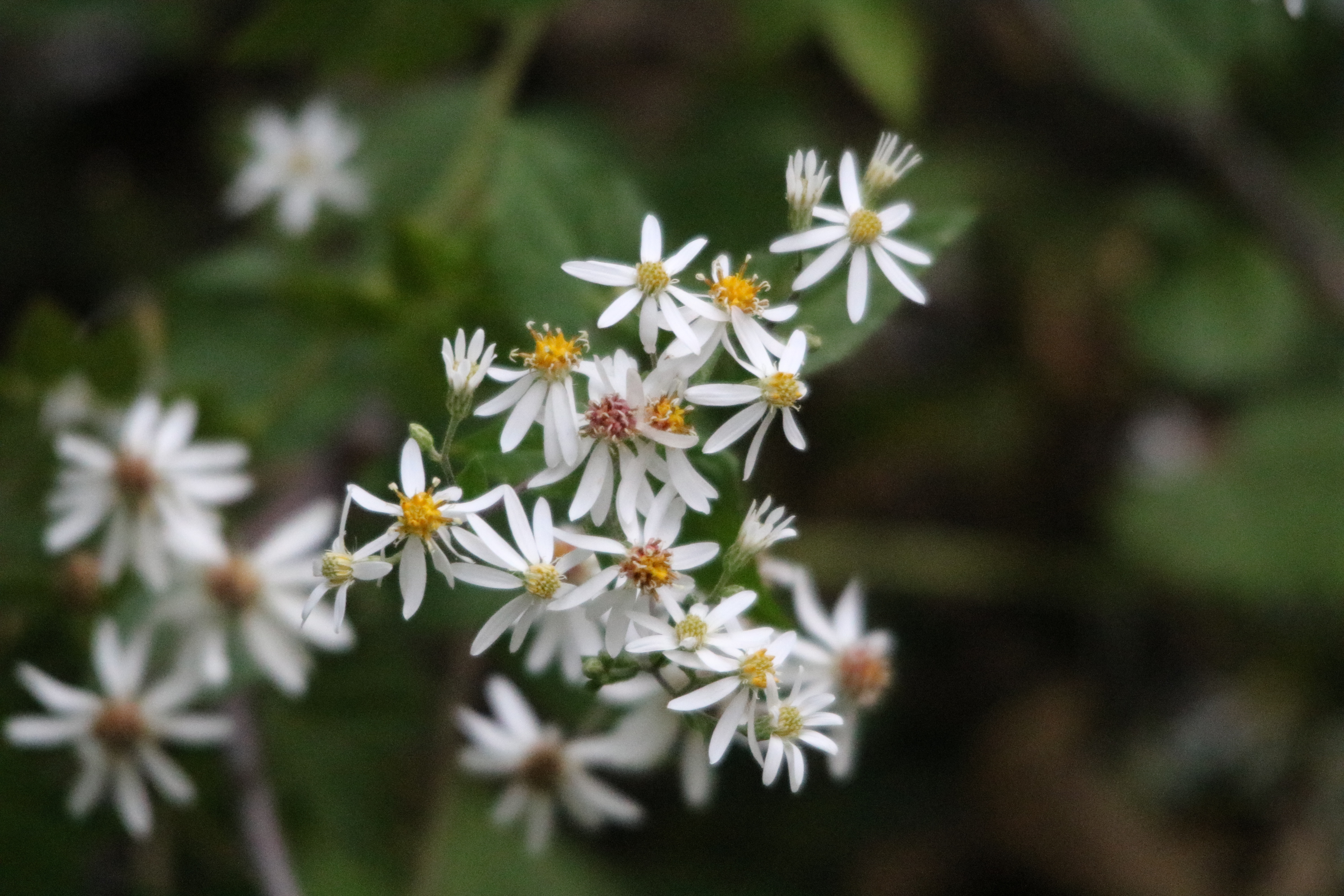

Conservation status
- Secure (NatureServe)

Scientific classification
- Kingdom: Plantae
- Clade: Tracheophytes
- Clade: Angiosperms
- Clade: Eudicots
- Clade: Asterids
- Order: Asterales
- Family: Asteraceae
- Genus: Eurybia
- Species: E. divaricata

Binomial name
- Eurybia divaricata (L.) G.L.Nesom
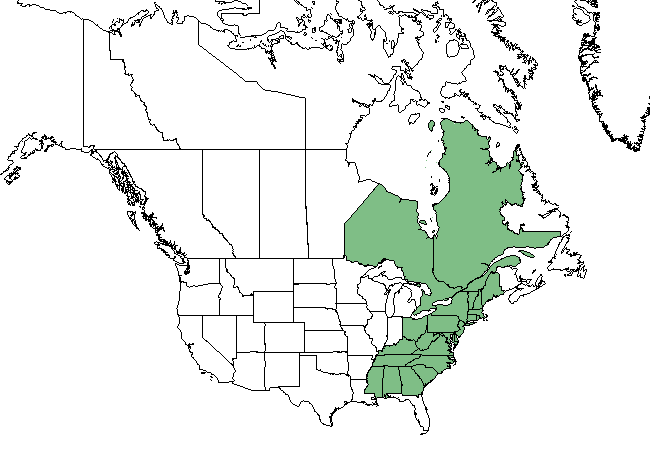
- Natural range in North America

Synonyms
- Synonymy: Aster boykinii E.S.Burgess; Aster carmesinus E.S.Burgess; Aster castaneus E.S.Burgess; Aster claytonii E.S.Burgess; Aster corymbosus Sol. ex Aiton; Aster divaricatus L.; Aster elatus Bertero ex Steud.; Aster excavatus E.S.Burgess; Aster fischeri Kuntze; Aster flexilis E.S.Burgess; Aster stilettiformis E.S.Burgess; Aster tenebrosus E.S.Burgess; Biotia corymbosa var. alata (W.P.C.Barton) DC.; Eurybia corymbosa (Sol. ex Aiton) Cass.

= Eurybia divaricata =

White wood aster

North American species of flowering plant

Eurybia divaricata (syn. Aster divaricatus), the white wood aster, is an herbaceous plant native to eastern North America. It occurs in the eastern United States, primarily in the Appalachian Mountains, though it is also present in southeastern Canada, in the provinces of Ontario, Quebec and Nova Scotia. In the U.S. it is abundant and common, but in Canada it is considered threatened due to its restricted distribution. It has been introduced to a number of countries in Europe. It can be found in dry open woods as well as along wood-edges and clearings. The species is distinguished by its flower heads that have yellow centers and white rays that are arranged in flat-topped corymbiform arrays, emerging in the late summer through fall. Other distinguishing characteristics include its serpentine stems and sharply serrated narrow heart-shaped leaves. The white wood aster is sometimes used in cultivation in both North America and Europe due to it being quite tough and for its showy flowers.

== Description ==
Eurybia divaricata is a late summer to fall-flowering herbaceous perennial, typically growing to heights between 30 and 90 cm, though some specimens may be up to 1.2 m (3.9 ft) tall. The plant emerges each year from rhizomes and forms dense colonies of clones that lack sterile rosettes. The rhizomes are branched, elongated and become woody with age. One simple erect stem is present per plant. It is flexible and nearly hairless to finely hairy near the base, though densely covered with fine hair towards the extremities. It is very similar to and often confused with E. chlorolepis, E. schreberi and Symphyotrichum cordifolium, though E. schreberi differs in having wider leaves with more teeth, while E. chlorolepis has more rays, longer involucres, and only occurs in the southern U.S. from Virginia to Georgia.

Three types of leaves with differing morphology are present: cauline leaves, or those that appear on the stem from the middle of the plant upwards; basal leaves, or those that are present at the base of the plant; and distal leaves, which are those found on the extremities of the plant. All types are thin and sharply serrated with 6 to 15 pointed teeth per side. They are ciliate, meaning they have small hairy projections emerging from the margins of the leaf, while the apices, or tips of the leaves, are acuminate, meaning they taper to a point. The adaxial (i.e. upper) surfaces of the leaves are nearly hairless or sparsely hairy, while the abaxial (i.e. lower) surfaces are sparsely hairy with the veins being more villous, or covered in shaggy hairs.

The basal leaves are ovate, or egg-shaped, with bases that are cordate, or heart-shaped. The blades measure 1.9 to 6.5 cm in length by 1.7 to 6 cm (0.67 to 2.36 in) in width and have petioles ranging in length from 2 to 7 cm. They wither when the plant flowers. The cauline leaves have petioles measuring 2.5 to 7 mm (0.098 to 0.276 in) long that are often winged. Their blades are also ovate, though the bases may be cordate to rounded. They measure 2 to 20 cm (1 to 8 in) long by 1 to 10 cm (0.5 to 4 in) wide, making them often much longer than the basal leaves. The distal leaves are typically sessile, meaning that no petiole is present, though they are sometimes subpetiolate, meaning a very short petiole is present. The blades are ovate to lanceolate, meaning lance-shaped, with rounded bases and are 0.5 to 2 cm (0.20 to 0.79 in) long by 0.1 to 0.8 cm (0.039 to 0.315 in) wide.

The capitula, or flower heads, are arranged in relatively flat-topped corymbiform arrays. The capitula number anywhere from 4 to 50 and up to 100 or more in exceptional cases. The peduncles, i.e. the flower stalks, are up to 1.5 cm (0.59 in) in length and are densely covered with non-glandular hairs. Bracts, modified leaves that appear at the axil of a peduncle, are typically absent, though in some cases up to two are present. The involucres, which are the whorls of small, scale-like modified leaves that appear at the base of the capitulum, are in between cylindric and campanulate (i.e. bell-shaped) in shape and measure 4.2 to 6 mm (0.17 to 0.24 in) long, making them much shorter than the pappi.

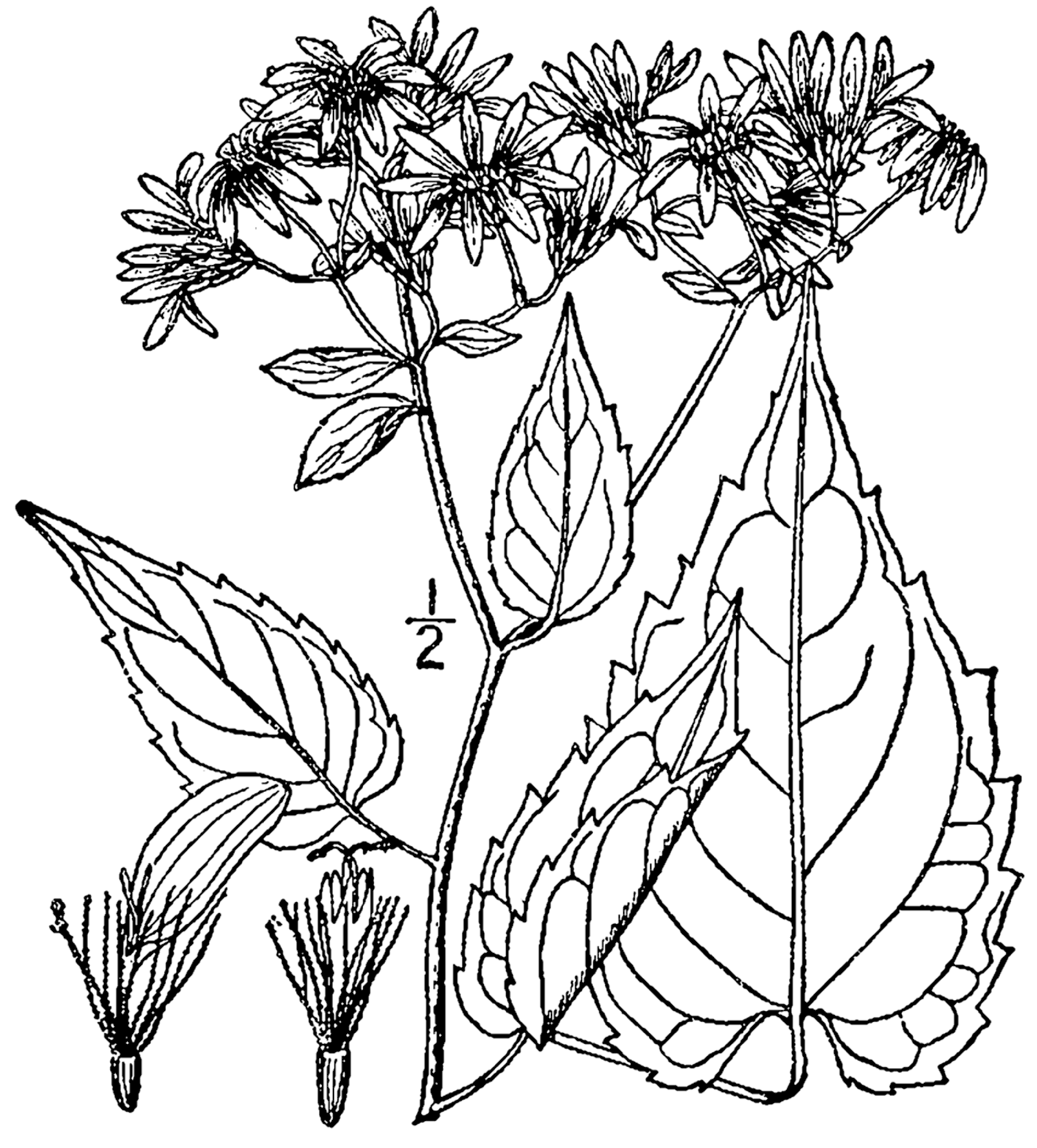
1913 line drawing

The phyllaries, which are the small leaves that make up the involucre, number from 25 to 30 and are arranged in 4 to 5 series. The inner phyllaries are between linear and lanceolate in shape with a purplish colouration towards the apices, while the outer ones are more oblong. All of the phyllaries are strongly unequal with hardened bases, margins that are somewhat scarious (i.e. thin, membranous and dry) as well as fimbriate-ciliate, meaning fringed with hair at the margins. Their apices are rounded to acute in shape, while the surfaces are sparsely haired, though sometimes sparsely covered in stipular glands. Their chlorophyllous zones, a darker green zone where chlorophyll is concentrated, appear on the upper half of the outer phyllaries, to the upper third or along the outer midveins of the inner phyllaries. The outer phyllaries typically measure 0.7 to 1.5 mm (0.028 to 0.059 in) wide with the lengths rarely exceeding 2.5 times the width.

As with most members of the family Asteraceae, the actual flowers appear in two different forms: as ray florets, which have strap-like appendages that look like petals and project around the outside of the capitulum, and as disc florets, which appear at the center of the flower head and are very small. The ray florets number between 5 and 10, though as many as 12 may be present. Their straps are white and measure 6 to 12 mm long by 1.5 to 2.2 mm wide. The disc florets number from 12 to 19 and up to 25 and have yellow corollas (i.e. petals, though they are fused into a tube) that are 4.1 to 4.8 and exceptionally 5.5 mm long. Their corollas are abruptly ampliate, or enlarged, with tubes that are longer than their campanulate throats. The tubes measure 2.3 to 2.6 mm while the throats are typically only 0.9 to 1.2 mm long. The lobes, i.e. the friges of the throat, are reflexed and lanceolate in shape, measuring 0.7 to 1.4 mm.

The fruit are cypselae, a type of achene, which are brown in colour, slightly compressed and are between cylindric and obovoid, or inversely egg-shaped. They are between 2.6 and 3.8 mm (0.10 and 0.15 in) in length and sparsely strigillose, or set with stiff bristly hairs, with 7 to 10 ribs, which themselves are tan to stramineous (i.e. straw-coloured). The pappi, which are modified sepals, are made up of reddish to cream-coloured bristles that are 3.7 to 5 mm (0.15 to 0.20 in) long, making them equal to or longer than the disc corollas in length. The bristles are fine and barbellulate, or barb-like, though they may be sometimes more or less clavate, or club-shaped, towards their apices.

== Similar species ==
Several different plants are superficially quite similar to the white wood aster, but close examination as well as knowledge of the plants' differing habitats and ranges can readily distinguish them. The most similar species is the mountain wood aster (Eurybia chlorolepis), which was previously considered conspecific with E. divaricata. E. chlorolepis differs in having flower stalks that are longer than 1.5 cm, while those of E. divaricata are shorter than this. The involucres of the mountain wood aster are generally between 6.5 and 9 mm in length, while those of the white wood aster are normally from 4.2 to 6.5 mm long, but in rare cases they may be as long as 7.5 mm. The mountain wood aster almost always has more rays than the white wood aster: the former usually has 12 to 16, but occasionally as few as 10, while the latter generally has 5 to 10 and never more than 12. The rays are also longer on the mountain wood aster at 17 to 18 mm in most cases, while the white wood aster's are generally only 10 to 15 mm. Lastly, E. chlorolepsis is present only from southern Virginia south to Georgia in the Appalachian Mountains at altitudes of 1,200 to 2,000 m (3,900 to 6,600 ft), while E. divaricata can be found from southern Canada south to Alabama, meaning their ranges only overlap in the southern United States, and there only at high elevations.

Another species commonly confused with the white wood aster is Schreber's aster (Eurybia schreberi). Schreber's aster is typically found on moister soils, though it can also be found on mesic sites. While much of their ranges overlap, Schreber's aster is not found south of Virginia or Tennessee. Schreber's aster can also be distinguished by the more numerous teeth on the leaves, typically numbering 15 to 30 per side to the white wood aster's 6 to 15 per side. The leaves are wider on Schreber's aster with broader sinuses at the bases. The flower stalks are also densely hairy on the white wood aster, while they are only sparsely haired on Schreber's aster. Lastly, the clones of E. schreberi have sterile rosettes, while those of E. divaricata do not.

Two other superficially similar plants include the bigleaf aster (Eurybia macrophylla) and the heartleaf aster (Symphyotrichum cordifolium), though both usually have blue or pale blue rays, while those of E. divaricata are always white. Both species sometimes have white rays in rare cases, but E. macrophylla can still be distinguished by its larger and broader leaves and S. cordifolium by its straighter and branched stems.

== Distribution and habitat ==
Eurybia divaricata is present primarily in the Appalachian Mountains in eastern North America, with some populations in adjacent lowlands. It can be found on dry to mesic sites in eastern deciduous and mixed deciduous woods as well as on edges, clearings, and roadsides. It is most common at altitudes ranging from 0 to 1,200 m (0 to 3,937 ft), though it can be found as high as 1,700 m (5,600 ft). In Canada, it is present in Ontario and Quebec, while in the United States it can be found in all states from Maine south as far as Alabama and west to Ohio and Kentucky. It also has been introduced to Europe, particularly to the Netherlands.

The species is known from only 25 locations in Canada, and is considered threatened.

== Cultivation and uses ==
While the white wood aster does not compare in popularity to the other cultivated asters, such as the New England aster, it does have its niche, especially in North American native gardens. The plant flowers earlier than many other asters, does not require any staking to support it and flowers well in shade. It is attractive to gardeners due to its showy white flowers that emerge in mid to late summer, its prostrate habit, as well as its hardiness and the minimal maintenance it requires. It has little problem with both disease and insects. They do require partial shade, however, and they perform best when given about 4 hours of sunlight. The plants can be cut to 20 cm (8 in) in the spring in order to delay flowering and increase the number of branches. It is marginally hardy in USDA zone 3, and fully hardy from zones 4 to 8. It is commonly available in North American nurseries and several cultivars have been selected, including:

- 'Fiesta', which has leaves streaked with white, giving the effect of confetti, and flowers that are light lavender. The selection was made in Waseca, Minnesota.
- 'Raiche Form', which has white flowers that are larger than usual and darker, thin, sinewy stems. The cultivar was found by Roger Raiche.
- 'Snow Heron', which has white flowers and dark green leaves splotched and streaked with white. The cultivar was selected from a chance seedling grown at the Heronswood Nursery in Washington.

The young leaves of the plant can be cooked and eaten.
