= Cryptenamine =

- Protoveratrine A, the main constituent of cryptenamine

Combination of
- Veratrum alkaloids: Antihypertensive
- Tannic acid: Counterion

Identifiers
- CAS Number: 1356-18-9
- DrugBank: DB00785
- ChemSpider: none
- UNII: QVO4N8484O

Cryptenamine (Unitensen) is a mixture of 10 hypotensive alkaloids extracted from Veratrum album (protoveratrines A and B; germitrine, neogermitrine, germerine, and germidine; jervine, rubijervine, and isorubijervine; and germbudine). It is a hypotensive and used in the treatment of hypertension.
