= V. nigrum =

V. nigrum may refer to:

- Verbascum nigrum, the dark mullein, a biennial or short-lived perennial herbaceous plant species
- Veratrum nigrum, the black hellebore, a medicinal and poisonous plant species native to Asia and Europe
- Vincetoxicum nigrum, a synonym for Cynanchum louiseae, the black swallow-wort or Louise's swallow-wort, a plant species native to Europe
