= Muldamine =

Organic compound, phytosterol alkaloid

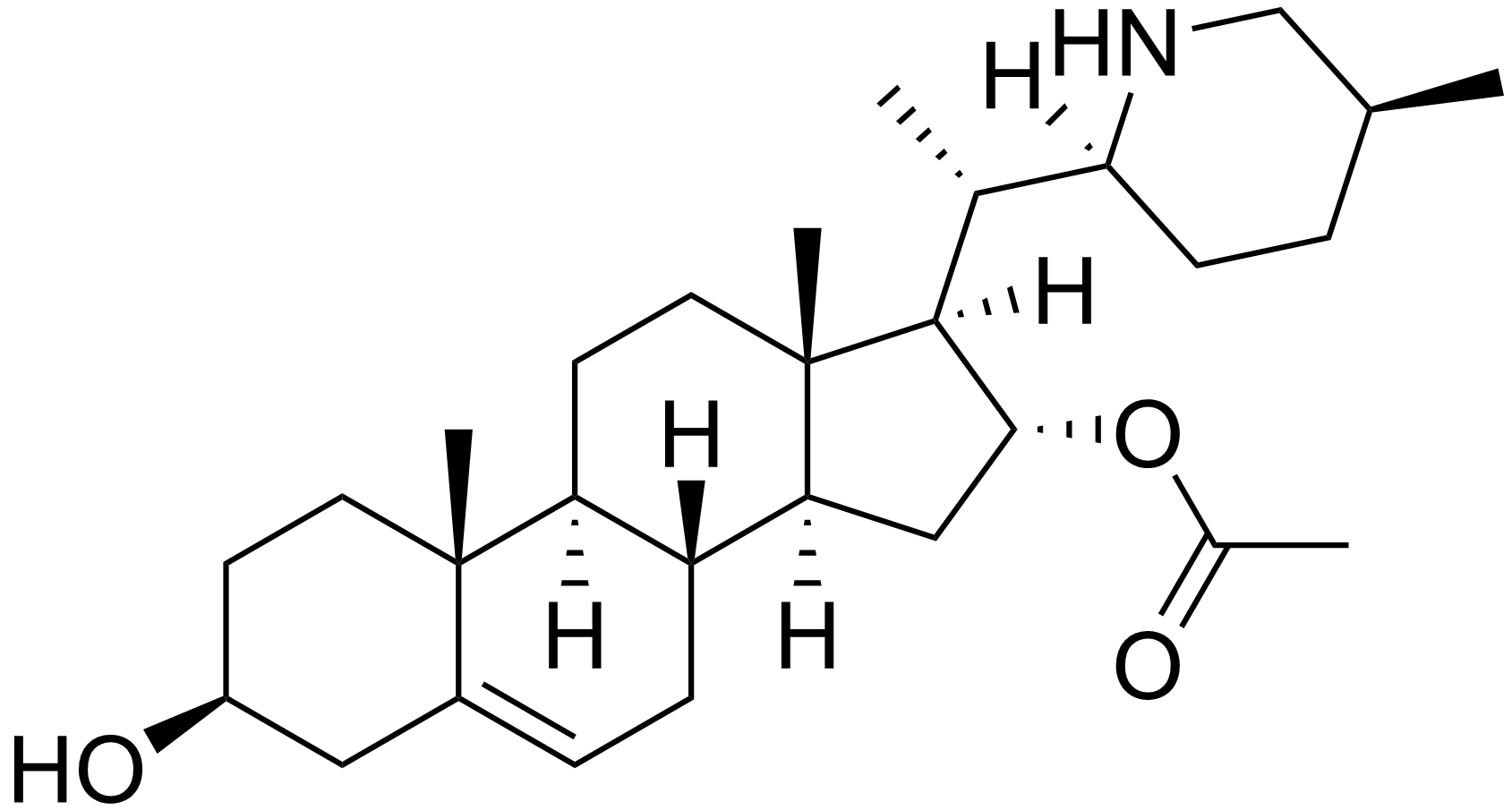
- Stereo skeletal formula of muldamine

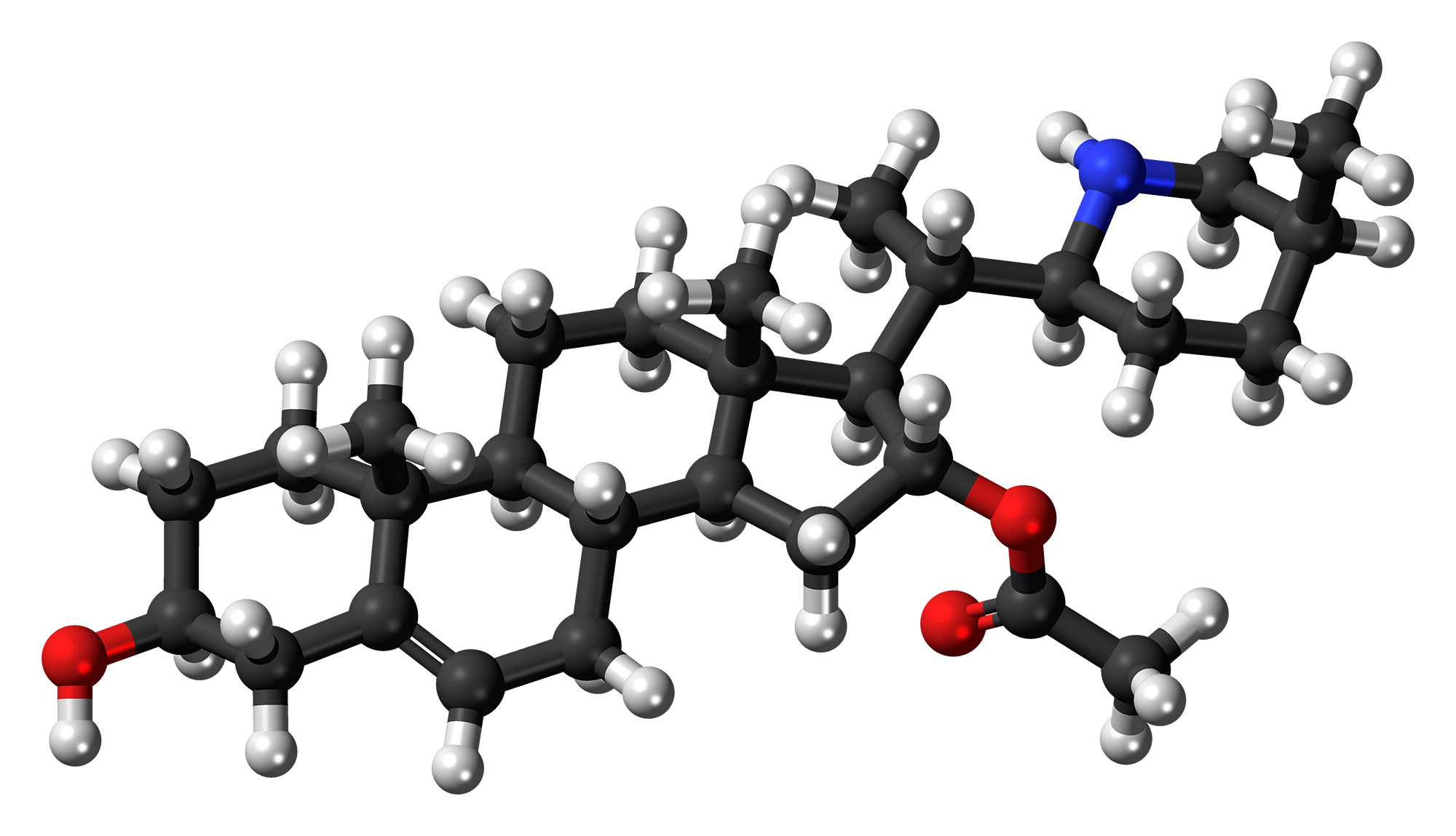

Names
- IUPAC name 3β-Hydroxy-16,28-seco-22β-solanid-5-en-16α-yl acetate
- Systematic IUPAC name (1R,2R,3aS,3bS,7S,9aR,9bS,11aS)-7-Hydroxy-9a,11a-dimethyl-1-{(1S)-1-[(2S,5S)-5-methylpiperidin-2-yl]ethyl}-2,3,3a,3b,4,6,7,8,9,9a,9b,10,11,11a-tetradecahydro-1H-cyclopenta[a]phenanthren-2-yl acetate
- Other names Alkaloid Q Teinemine 16-acetate 5-Veratranine-3β,11α-diol 11-acetate

Identifiers
CAS Number	36069-45-1
3D model (JSmol)	Interactive image
ChemSpider	10183538
MeSH	Muldamine
PubChem CID	21575037
UNII	Q683N7457H
CompTox Dashboard (EPA)	DTXSID30189650
- InChI: InChI=1S/C29H47NO3/c1-17-6-9-25(30-16-17)18(2)27-26(33-19(3)31)15-24-22-8-7-20-14-21(32)10-12-28(20,4)23(22)11-13-29(24,27)5/h7,17-18,21-27,30,32H,6,8-16H2,1-5H3 Key: ZVYUDNWAHWVPPN-UHFFFAOYSA-N
- SMILES: CC(C1C(CC2C3CC=C4CC(O)CCC4(C)C3CCC12C)OC(C)=O)C1CCC(C)CN1

Properties
Chemical formula	C_{29}H_{47}NO_{3}
Molar mass	457.699 g·mol^{−1}
- Except where otherwise noted, data are given for materials in their standard state (at 25 °C [77 °F], 100 kPa). Infobox references

Muldamine is a phytosterol alkaloid isolated from Veratrum californicum. It is the acetate ester of the piperidine steroid teinemine.

== See also ==
- Veratrum
- Veratridine
