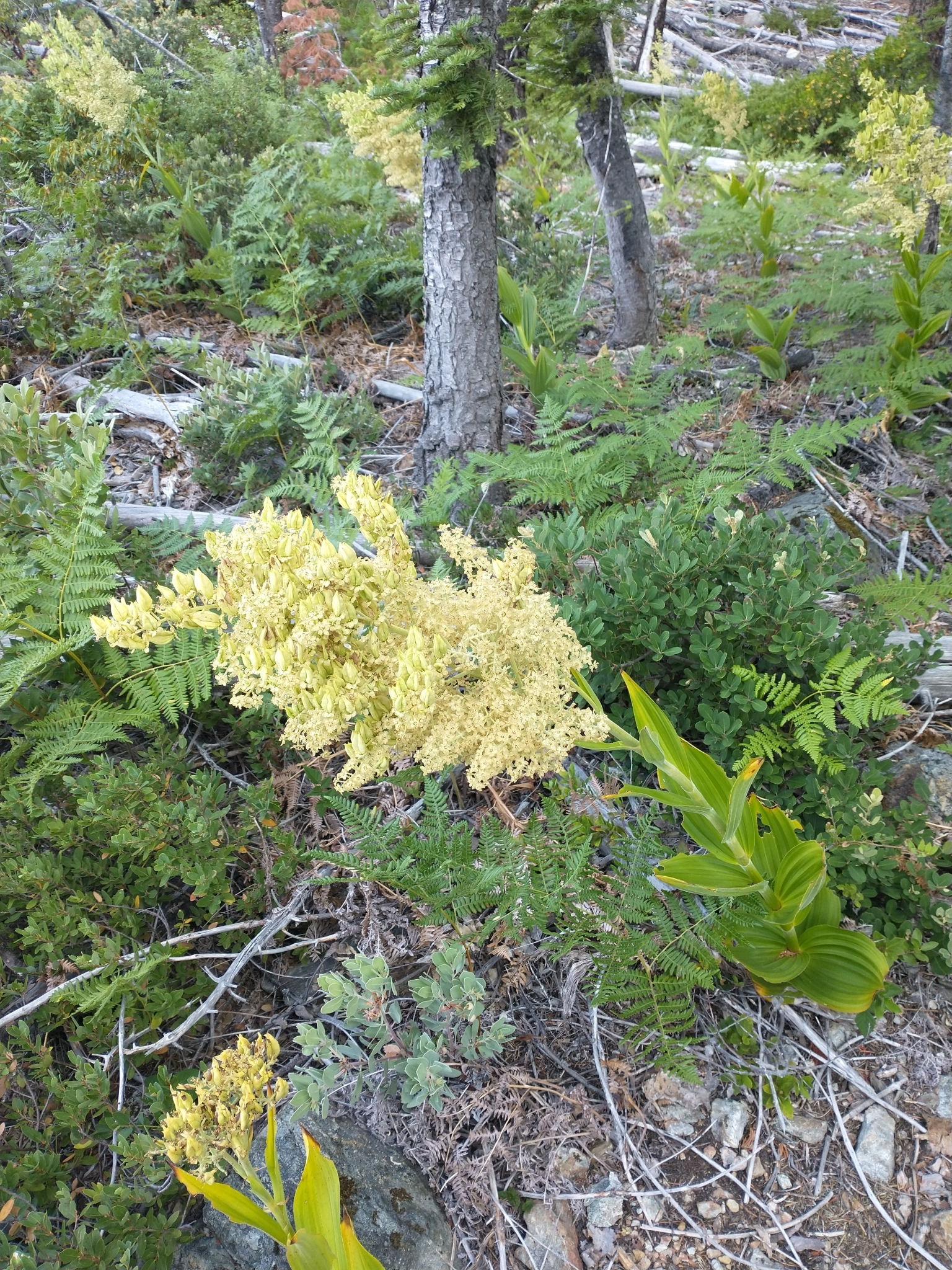

Scientific classification
- Kingdom: Plantae
- Clade: Tracheophytes
- Clade: Angiosperms
- Clade: Monocots
- Order: Liliales
- Family: Melanthiaceae
- Genus: Veratrum
- Species: V. insolitum

Binomial name
- Veratrum insolitum Jeps.

= Veratrum insolitum =

Species of flowering plant

Veratrum insolitum is a species of false hellebore, a type of plant closely related to the lily. Its common name is Siskiyou false hellebore. It is native to the northwestern United States: Washington (Klickitat County), western Oregon, and northwestern California as far south as Trinity County.

Veratrum insolitum is a stout, hollow-stemmed perennial growing from a thick rhizome in the clay soil of wet evergreen forests. The erect cornstalk-shaped plant bears several large green elliptical leaves decreasing in size higher up on the grayish stem. The large panicle inflorescence is packed with many off-white hairy flowers each just under a centimeter wide. There are six fringed tepals and six stout stamens, each with a club-shaped yellow anther. The fruit is a capsule 2 to 3 centimeters long which contains large winged seeds.
