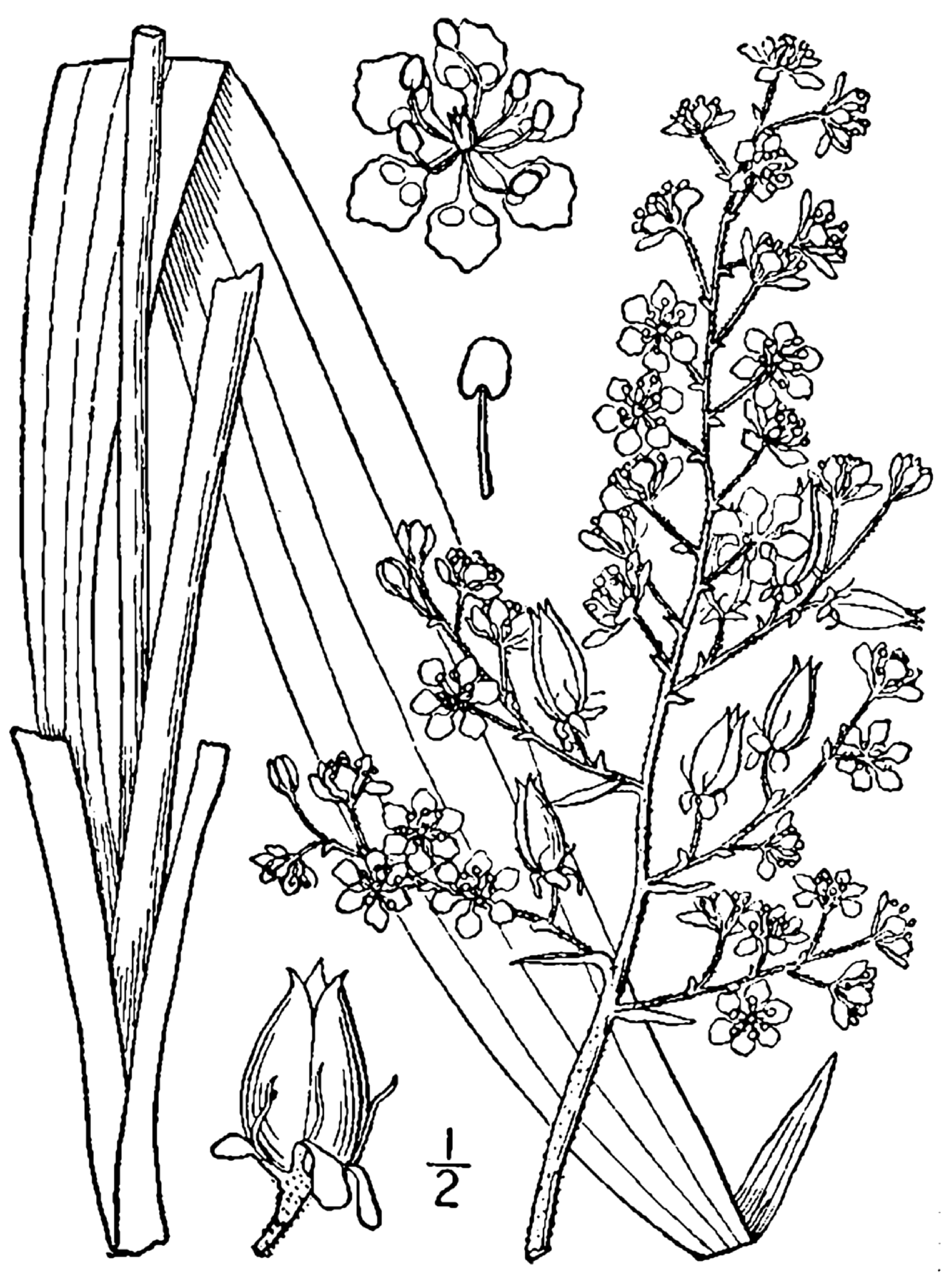
- Veratrum hybridum

Conservation status
- Secure (NatureServe)

Scientific classification
- Kingdom: Plantae
- Clade: Tracheophytes
- Clade: Angiosperms
- Clade: Monocots
- Order: Liliales
- Family: Melanthiaceae
- Genus: Veratrum
- Species: V. hybridum

Binomial name
- Veratrum hybridum Desr.

Synonyms
- Melanthium hybridum Walter 1788; Melanthium latifolium Desr. 1797; Leimanthium hybridum (Walter) Sweet; Evonyxis hybrida (Walter) Raf.; Melanthium virginicum var. hybridum (Walter) Alph.Wood; Melanthium racemosum Michx.; Melanthium latifolium var. longipedicellatum A.Br.; Veratrum latifolium (Desr.) Zomlefer

= Veratrum hybridum =

Species of flowering plant

Veratrum hybridum is a species of flowering plant in the Melanthiaceae known by the common names slender bunchflower and crisped bunchflower. Many publications use the synonyms Melanthium latifolium and Veratrum latifolium, but the "hybridum" epithet is 9 years older than the "latifolium," so Veratrum hybridum is now the accepted name.

It is native to the eastern United States, particularly in the Appalachian Mountains.

This perennial herb grows from a bulb with a network of rhizomes. The stem grows up to 1.6 meters tall. The lance-shaped leaves reach up to 55 centimeters long by 7.2 centimeters wide. The inflorescence is a raceme branching into secondary, and sometimes tertiary, racemes. Each flower has woolly green or purplish bracts and six white or yellowish tepals. The fruit is a capsule up to 2 centimeters long containing winged seeds. Though the plant produces flowers and seeds, flowering occurs irregularly, and most reproduction may be vegetative, when the plant sprouts from its rhizome.

This plant occurs in deciduous forests. It occurs in moist, shady habitat such as gorges. It sometimes grows alongside Appalachian bunchflower (Melanthium parviflorum), but generally at lower elevations. At a site in the Shenandoah National Forest it was noted to grow with oak and hickory. Associated plants include white snakeroot (Ageratina altissima), flypoison (Amianthium muscitoxicum), wild yam (Dioscorea villosa), white wood aster (Eurybia divaricata), bigleaf aster (E. macrophylla), Allegheny hawkweed (Hieracium paniculatum), widowsfrill (Silene stellata), Atlantic goldenrod (Solidago arguta), mountain decumbent goldenrod (S. caesia var. curtisii), hairy goldenrod (S. hispida), meadow zizia (Zizia aptera), and eastern hayscented fern (Dennstaedtia punctilobula).
