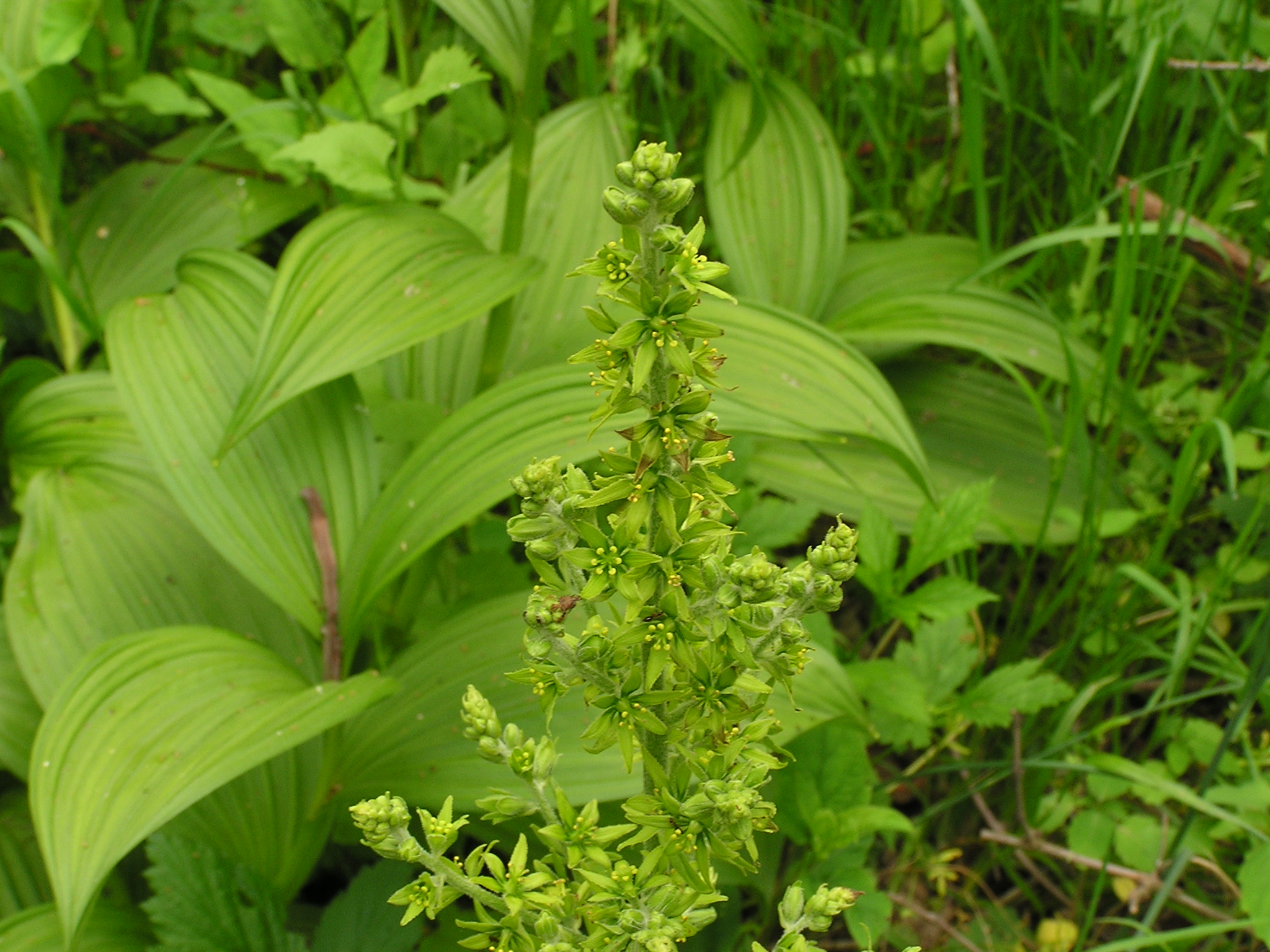
- Veratrure valchutsee bamsin

Scientific classification
- Kingdom: Plantae
- Clade: Tracheophytes
- Clade: Angiosperms
- Clade: Monocots
- Order: Liliales
- Family: Melanthiaceae
- Genus: Veratrum
- Species: V. viride

Binomial name
- Veratrum viride Aiton

Synonyms
- Synonymy: Helonias viridis (Aiton) Ker Gawl.; Veratrum lobelianum var. eschscholtzianum Schult. & Schult.f., syn of var. eschscholzianum; Veratrum eschscholtzianum (Schult. & Schult.f.) O.Loes., syn of var. eschscholzianum; Veratrum eschscholtzii A.Gray, syn of var. eschscholzianum; Veratrum viride var. escholtzianoides O.Loes., syn of var. eschscholzianum; Veratrum eschscholtzii var. incriminatum B.Boivin, syn of var. eschscholzianum; Veratrum eschscholtzii var. typicum B.Boivin, syn of var. eschscholzianum; Veratrum viride subsp. eschscholtzii (A.Gray) Á.Löve & D.Löve, syn of var. eschscholzianum

= Veratrum viride =

Species of plant

Veratrum viride, known as Indian poke, corn-lily, Indian hellebore, false hellebore, green false hellebore, or giant false-helleborine, is a species of Veratrum native to eastern and western (but not central) North America. It is extremely toxic, and is considered a pest plant by farmers with livestock. The species has acquired a large number of other common names within its native range, including American false hellebore, American white hellebore, bear corn, big hellebore, corn lily, devil's bite, duck retten, itchweed, poor Annie, blue hellebore and tickleweed.

== Description ==
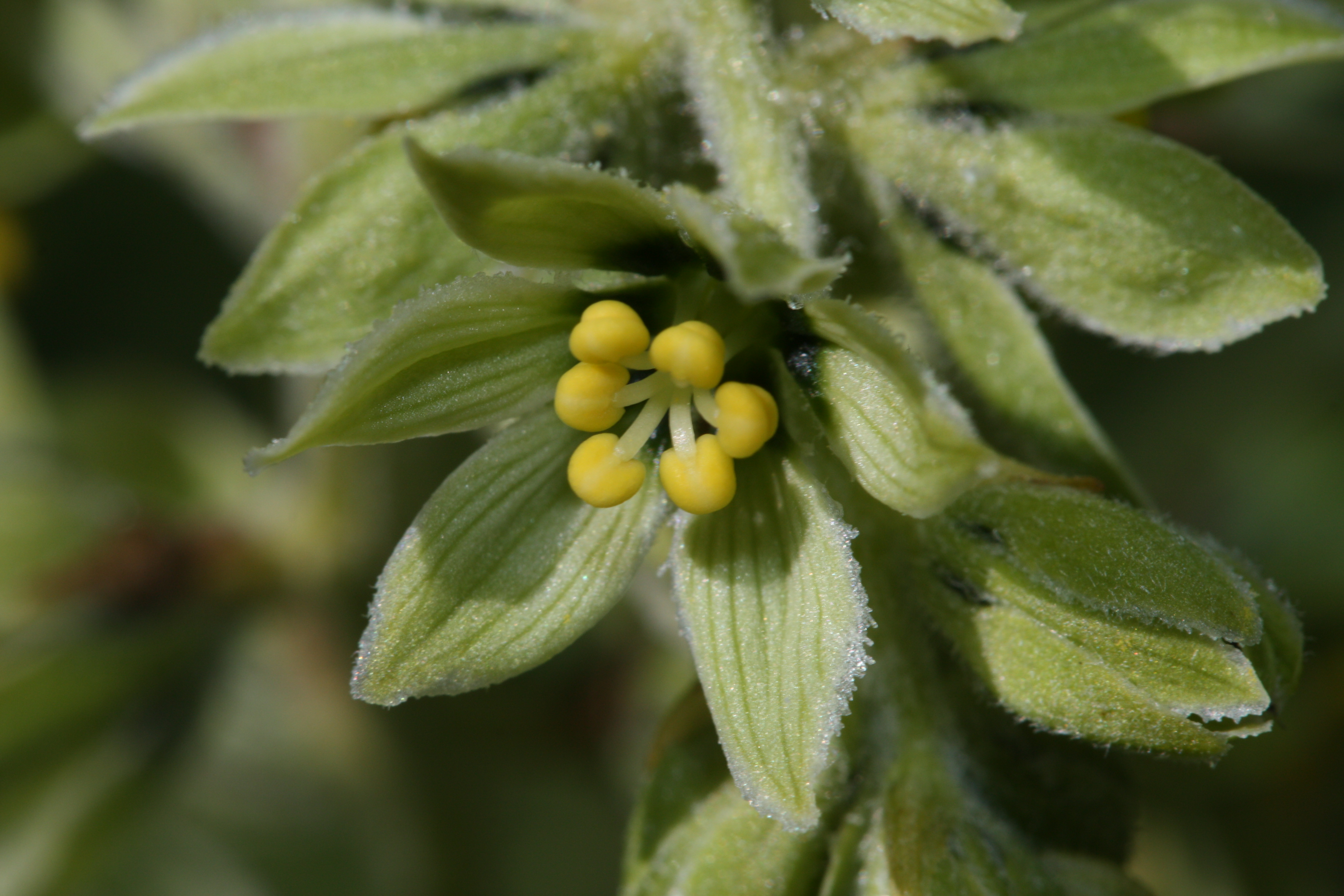
V. viride flower at Alpine Lakes Wilderness in Washington state

V. viride is a herbaceous perennial plant reaching 0.7 to 2 metres (2.3 to 6.6 ft) tall, with a solid green stem. The leaves are spirally arranged, 10 to 35 cm (4 to 14 in) long and 5 to 20 cm (2 to 8 in) broad, elliptic to broad lanceolate ending in a short point, heavily ribbed and hairy on the underside. The flowers are numerous, produced in a large branched inflorescence 30 to 70 cm (1.0 to 2.3 ft) tall; each flower is 5 to 12 mm (0.2 to 0.5 in) long, with six green to yellow-green tepals. The fruit is a capsule 1.5 to 3 cm (0.6 to 1.2 in) long, which splits into three sections at maturity to release the numerous flat 8 to 10 mm (0.3 to 0.4 in) diameter seeds. The plant reproduces through rhizome growth as well as seeds.

== Varieties and similar species ==
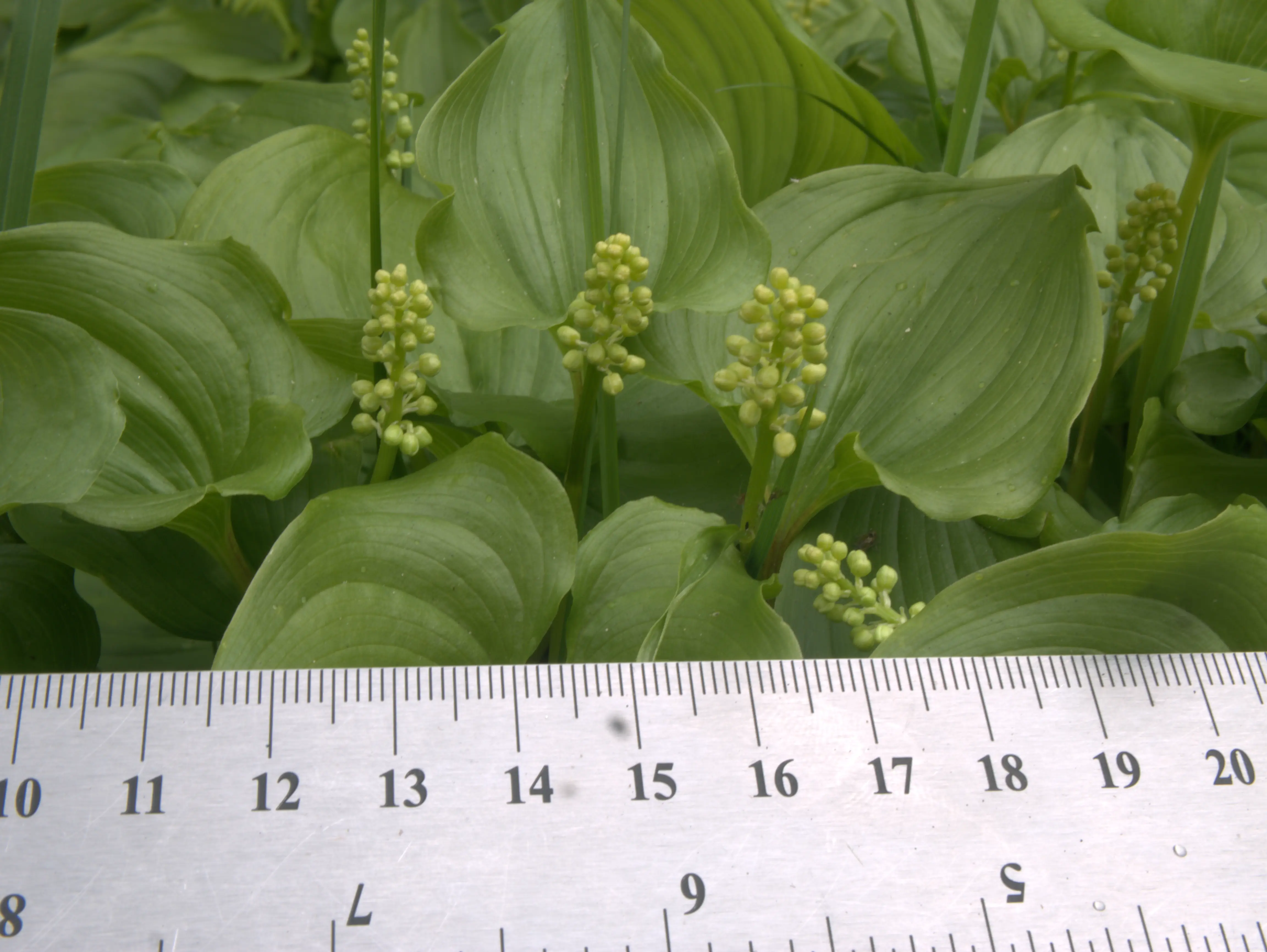
Veratrum viride var. eschscholzianum in Port Edward, British Columbia

There are two recognized varieties of V. viride:

- Veratrum viride var. viride is found in eastern North America. It is differentiated by the erect or spreading side branches of the inflorescence.
- Veratrum viride var. eschscholzianum is found in western North America. It is differentiated by the drooping side branches of the inflorescence.

The related western North American Veratrum californicum (white false hellebore, California corn-lily) can be distinguished from sympatric var. eschscholzianum by its whiter flowers and the erect/ascending side branches of the inflorescence.

== Distribution and habitat ==
In eastern North America, var. viride occurs from southwestern Labrador and southern Quebec south to northern Georgia. In the west, var. eschscholzianum occurs from Alaska and Northwest Territory south through Yukon, British Columbia, Alberta, Washington, Idaho, Montana, and Oregon to northwestern California (Del Norte, Siskiyou, Trinity, and Humboldt Counties).

It is found in wet soils in meadows, sunny streambanks, and open forests, occurring from sea level in the north of its range up to 1,600 metres (5,200 ft) in the southeast and 2,500 metres (8,200 ft) in the southwest.

== Medicine ==
The plant is highly toxic, causing nausea and vomiting. If the poison is not evacuated, cold sweat and vertigo appear. Respiration slows, while cardiac rhythm and blood pressure fall. The toxic effects of veratrum alkaloids are directly induced by antagonism of adrenergic receptors.

It is used externally by several Native American nations. Although is rarely ever used in modern herbalism due to its concentration of various alkaloids, it has been used in the past against high blood pressure and rapid heartbeat; a standardized extract of V. viride alkaloids known as alkavervir was used in the 1950s and 1960s as an antihypertensive. The root contains even higher concentrations than the aerial parts.

== Anecdote ==
Various sources mention its use by some Native Americans people to elect a new leader. This story appears to originate from an anecdote told by John Josselyn in his 1674 "An Account of Two Voyages to New-England". It is noteworthy that Josselyn's "Account of Two Voyages" have been met with skepticism since their first publication.

"The English in New-England take white Hellebore, which operates as fairly with them, as with the Indians, who steeping of it in water sometime, give it to young lads gathered together a purpose to drink, if it come up they force them to drink again their vomit, (which they save in a Birchen-dish) till it stayes with them, & he that gets the victory of it is made Captain of the other lads for that year."

The anecdote entered medical literature 161 years afterward, when retold by Osgood C. in an 1835 paper on Veratrum viride. While quoting Josselyn, Osgood introduces a political connotation (election of their chiefs/entitled to command the rest) which is unclear in the original version.

" Its use in the election of their chiefs, is noticed by Joselin, an early visiter to this country, who calls it "white hellebore." According to this writer, that individual whose on the Veratrum Viride. stomach was least susceptible to its deleterious effects, was regarded as the "strongest of the party, and entitled to command the rest."
