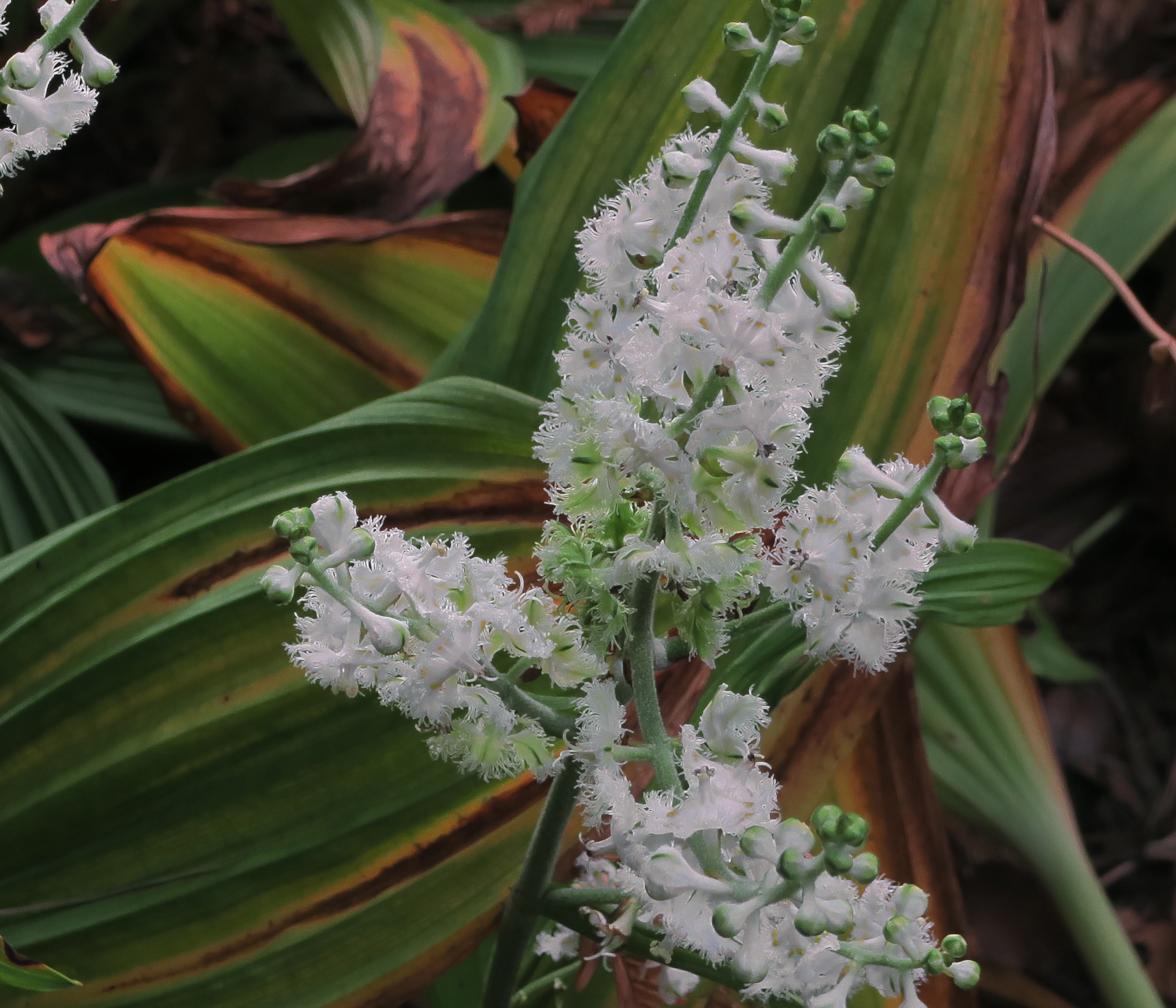

Scientific classification
- Kingdom: Plantae
- Clade: Tracheophytes
- Clade: Angiosperms
- Clade: Monocots
- Order: Liliales
- Family: Melanthiaceae
- Genus: Veratrum
- Species: V. fimbriatum

Binomial name
- Veratrum fimbriatum A.Gray

= Veratrum fimbriatum =

Species of flowering plant

Veratrum fimbriatum is an uncommon species of false hellebore, a type of plant closely related to the lily. Its common names are fringed false hellebore and fringed corn lily. It is endemic to California where it is a rare resident of the northern coastal scrub plant communities of Mendocino and Sonoma Counties. This flowering plant is a stout, hollow-stemmed perennial growing from a thick rhizome. The erect flowering plant bears several large, flat, green leaves near the base of the green stem. The large panicle inflorescence is packed with many distinctive, lacy-fringed flowers each up to a centimeter wide. The flower bud is club-shaped before it opens into a bloom of six frilly tepals, each of which bears two bright green or gold glands. The ovary and sepals extend straight outward as one thick stalk. The fruit is an oval-shaped capsule just under a centimeter long containing the seeds.
