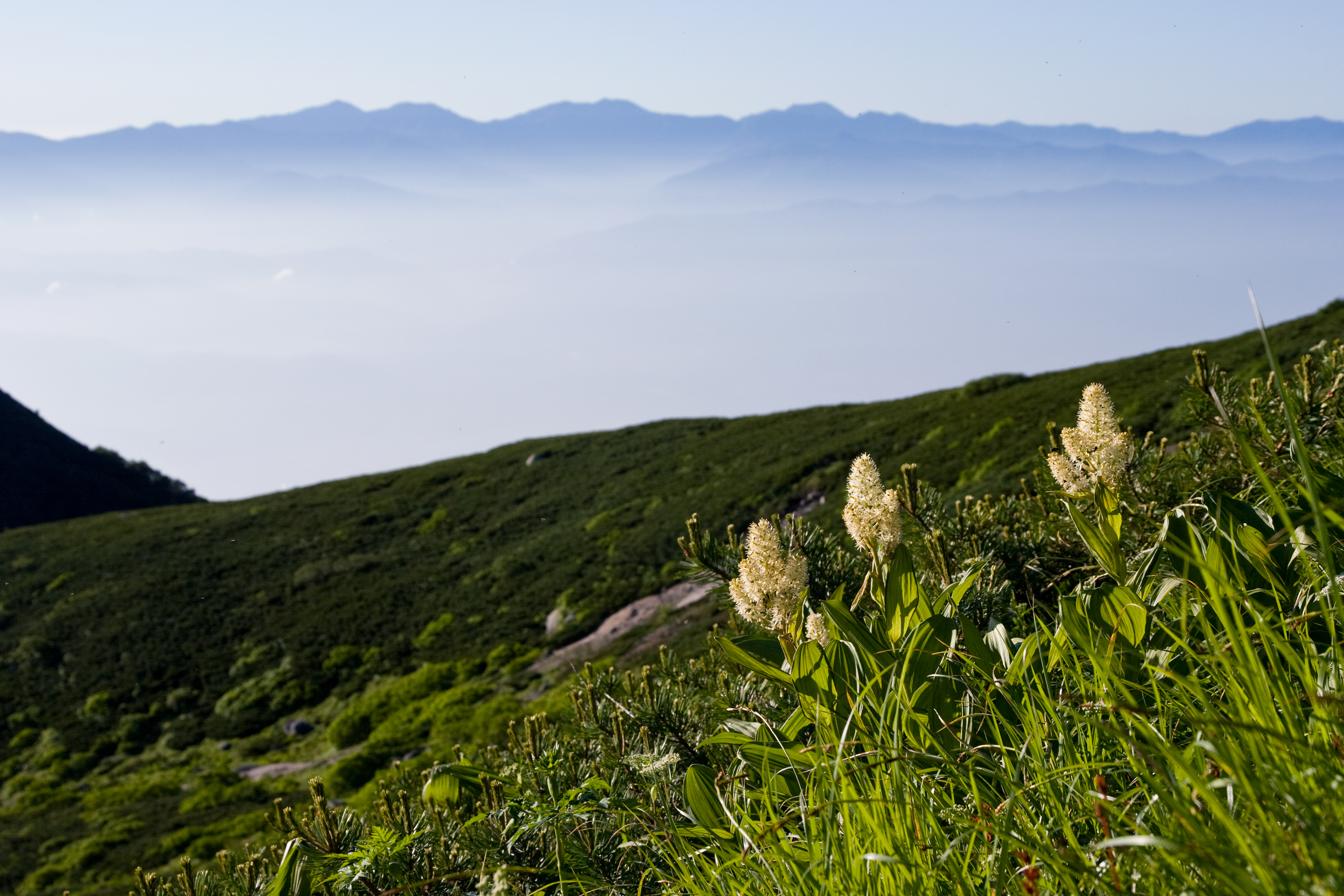

Scientific classification
- Kingdom: Plantae
- Clade: Tracheophytes
- Clade: Angiosperms
- Clade: Monocots
- Order: Liliales
- Family: Melanthiaceae
- Genus: Veratrum
- Species: V. stamineum

Binomial name
- Veratrum stamineum Maxim.

Synonyms
- Heterotypic Synonyms: Veratrum stamineum var. glabrum Nakai; Veratrum stamineum f. lasiophyllum (Nakai) T.Shimizu; Veratrum stamineum var. lasiophyllum Nakai; Veratrum stamineum var. micranthum Satake

= Veratrum stamineum =

Species of plant

Veratrum stamineum is a species of flowering plant in the family Melanthiaceae. It is endemic to Northern and Central Japan.
