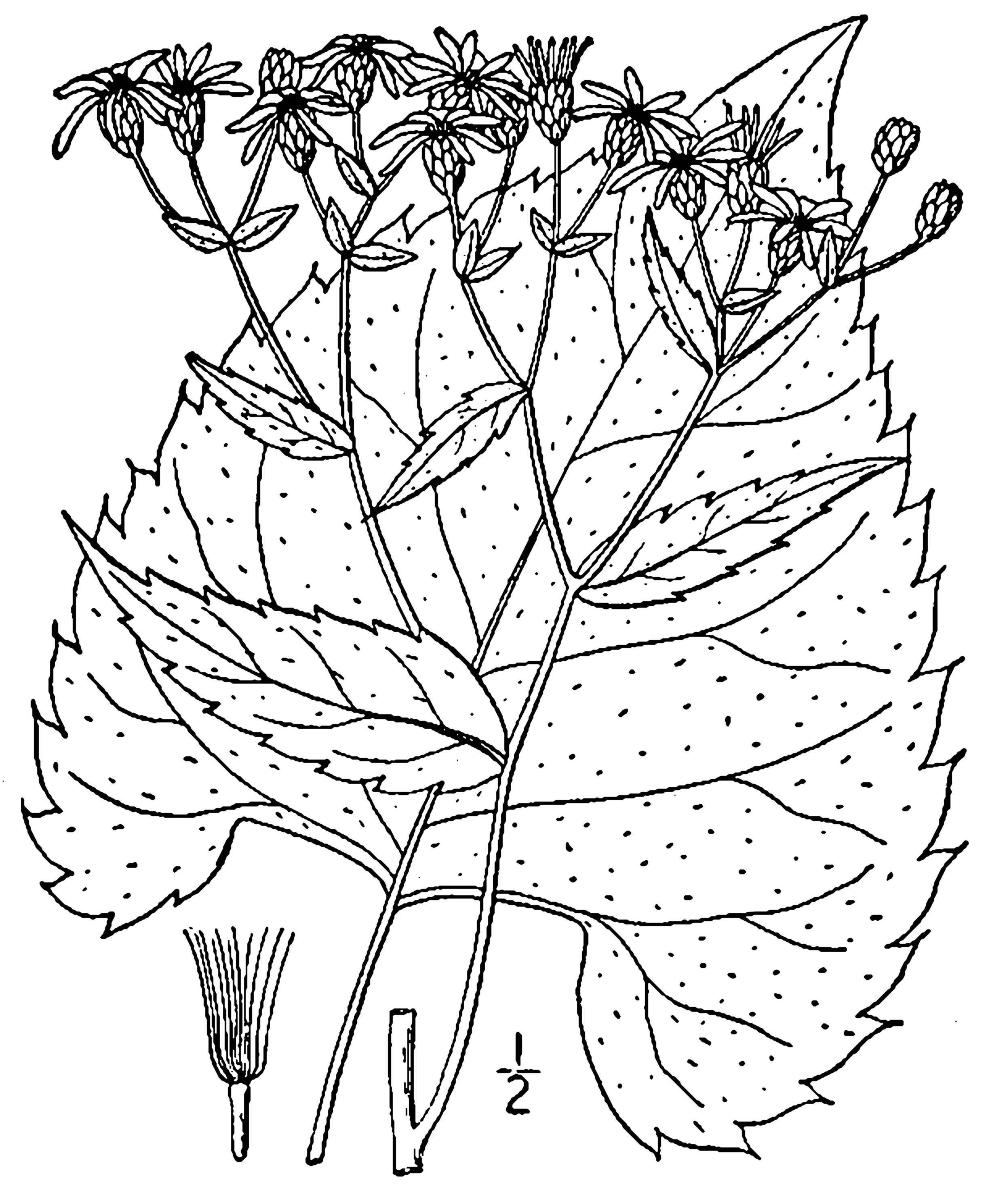
- 1913 Line drawing

Conservation status
- Apparently Secure (NatureServe)

Scientific classification
- Kingdom: Plantae
- Clade: Tracheophytes
- Clade: Angiosperms
- Clade: Eudicots
- Clade: Asterids
- Order: Asterales
- Family: Asteraceae
- Genus: Eurybia
- Species: E. schreberi

Binomial name
- Eurybia schreberi (Nees) Nees

Synonyms
- Aster schreberi Nees; Aster chasei G.N.Jones; Biotia glomerata (Nees) DC.; Biotia schreberi (Nees) DC.; Eurybia glomerata Bernh. ex Nees

= Eurybia schreberi =

Species of flowering plant

Eurybia schreberi, commonly called Schreber's aster or nettle-leaved Michaelmas-daisy, is a perennial herb in the family Asteraceae. It is native to eastern North America, where it is present in Canada and the United States. The flower heads emerge in the late summer or early fall to show white ray florets and yellow disc florets. It is listed as endangered in Indiana and Iowa, of special concern in Tennessee and possibly extirpated in Maine.

== Distribution and habitat ==
Eurybia schreberi is native to the eastern United States and Canada. In the latter country, it is present only in Ontario. In the U.S., it can be found in every state east of Wisconsin, Iowa, Illinois, Kentucky and Tennessee, except for in North Carolina and to its south. It has also been introduced to Europe, specifically to Scotland. It is most common at elevations from 0 to 1200 metres (0–4000 feet) in damp to mesic deciduous mixed woods, most often those with maple, elm or oak, as well as in thickets and shaded roadbanks.
