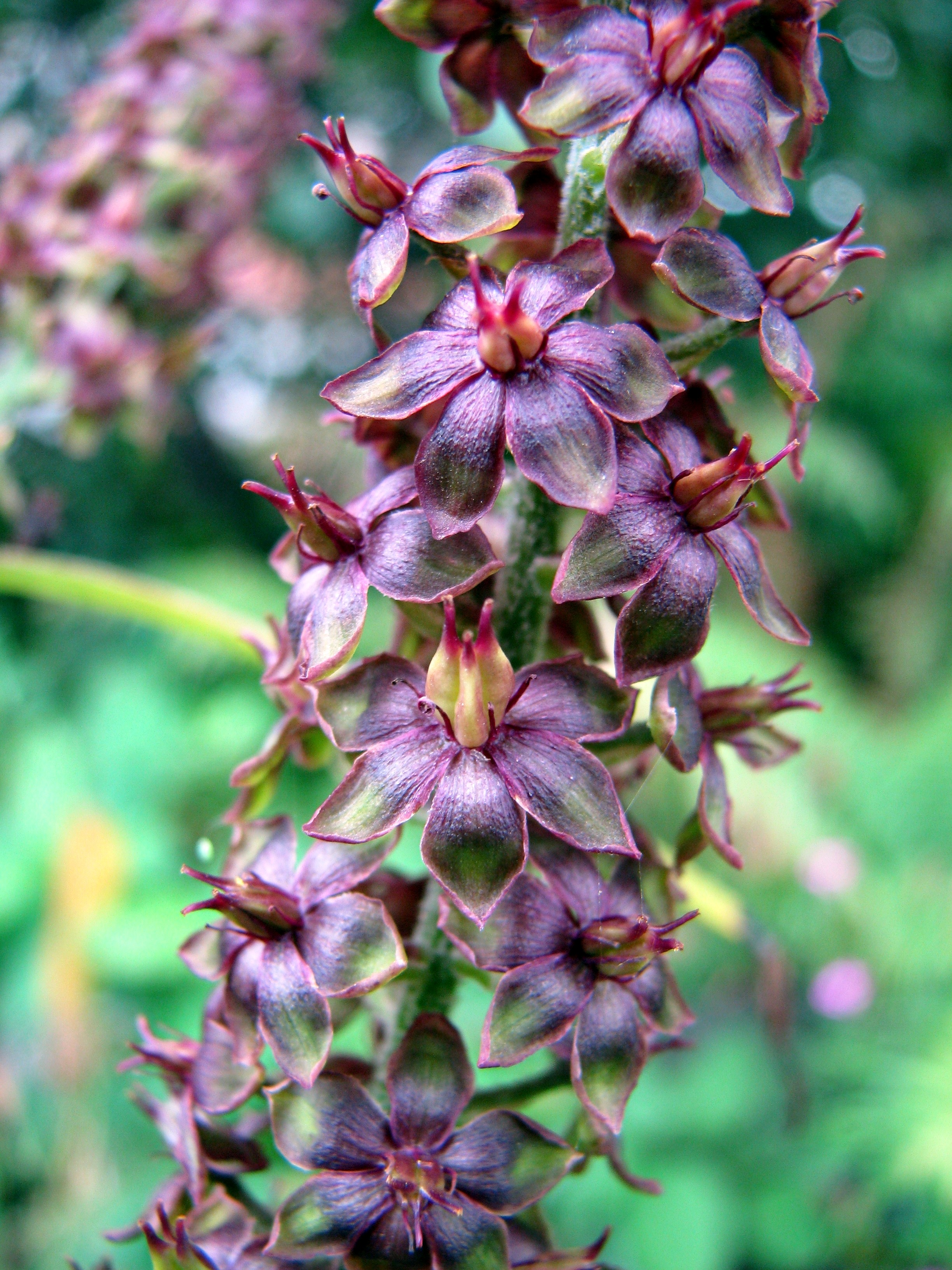

Scientific classification
- Kingdom: Plantae
- Clade: Tracheophytes
- Clade: Angiosperms
- Clade: Monocots
- Order: Liliales
- Family: Melanthiaceae
- Genus: Veratrum
- Species: V. nigrum

Binomial name
- Veratrum nigrum L.

Synonyms
- Synonymy: Veratrum purpureum Salisb.; Melanthium nigrum (L.) Thunb.; Helonias nigra (L.) Ker Gawl.; Veratrum bracteatum Batalin; Veratrum nigrum var. ussuriense O.Loes.; Veratrum nigrum var. microcarpum Loes.; Veratrum ussuriense (O.Loes.) Nakai; Veratrum nigrum subsp. ussuriense (O.Loes.) Vorosch.

= Veratrum nigrum =

Black false hellebore

Species of plant

Veratrum nigrum, the black false hellebore, is a widespread Eurasian species of perennial flowering plant in the family Melanthiaceae. Despite its common name, V. nigrum is not closely related to the true hellebores, nor does it resemble them.

The plant was widely known even in ancient times. For example, Lucretius (ca. 99 BCE – ca. 55 BCE) and Pliny the Elder (23 AD – August 25, 79) both knew of its medicinal emetic as well as deadly toxic properties.

== Distribution and habitat ==
Veratrum nigrum is native to Eurasia from France to Korea including Germany, Poland, Russia, China, and Mongolia. The plant can exist in hardiness zones 4 through 7. It grows best in shade or partial shade, with wet or moist grounds conditions. Any nutrient-rich soil supports its growth, although one source observes that it prefers calcium-rich soil. Another source observes that the bed must be fairly deep.

== Description ==
The plant has a robust black rhizome. Simple angiosperm leaves arranged in a whorled pattern emerge from the base of the plant. Each whorl is decussate (rotated by half the angle between the leaves in the whorl below), with only two or three whorls around the base. Each leaf is sessile (attaching directly to the plant), and about 12 inches (300 mm) in length. The leaves are broad, glabrous (smooth), lanceolate in shape, with entire (smooth) edges. The veins in the leaves branch immediately from the base and run parallel through the leaf, leaving a pleated look. Long, green, coarse, woody spike racemes branch off in decussate patterns from the main trunk, with short pedicels supporting a single flower. The flowers are purple-black, giving the plant its name.

Veratrum nigrum blooms in early summer for several weeks, but goes dormant in intense summer heat. It tends to grow in colonies, and attains a height of about 4 feet (1.2 m). Its racemes branch out to about 24 inches (610 mm) in width. The seed heads are crimson in color. Plants grown from seeds will generally push through the earth and sprout leaves in early spring.

== Garden use ==
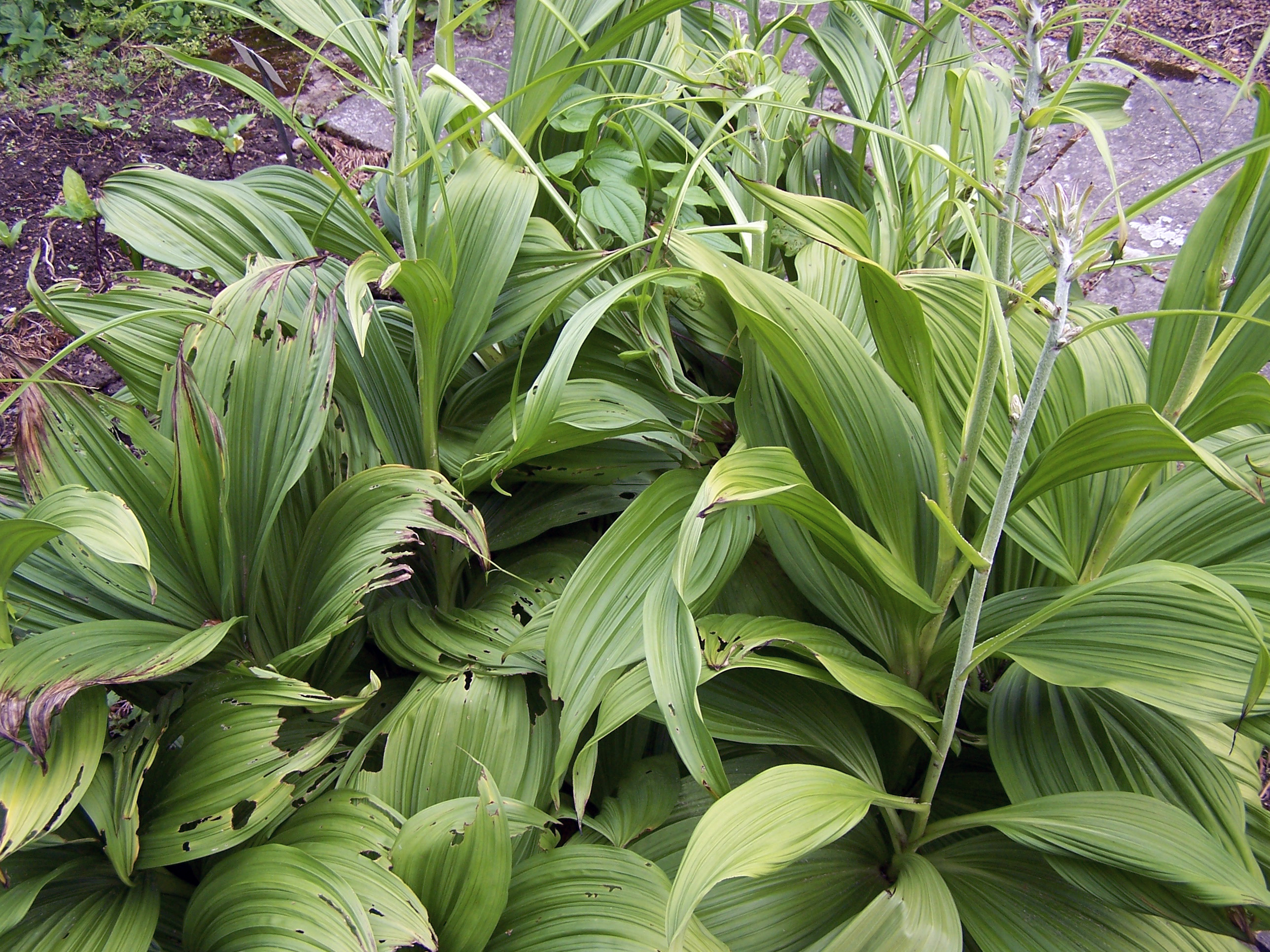
Foliage

Veratrum nigrum was used as an ornamental plant in European gardens at least as far back as 1773. It was in common use in 1828, and Charles Darwin grew it in his garden in the 1840s. The plant is still widely used in gardens in Europe and Asia because of its striking black flowers. It is also used to add height to a garden, and as a means of providing a darker backdrop to more brightly colored plants and flowers. The large seed pods weather winter well (tending not to drop in high wind), and it can be a striking winter ornamental seedpod plant as well. However, it is difficult to find and very expensive in the United States.

This plant has gained the Royal Horticultural Society's Award of Garden Merit.

Propagation is by seed or by division. However, a plant generally takes seven years to reach maturity and flower. Snails and slugs feed on the plant's rhizomes and leaves, so gardeners must take care to keep these pests away.

== Toxicity ==
All parts of the plant are highly toxic. However, the highest concentrations of toxins tend to be in the rhizome. Toxicity varies widely depending on the method of preparation (extract, water extract, etc.), and the method of application. Just 1.8 grams (0.063 oz) per 1 kilogram (2.2 lb) can cause death due to cardiac arrhythmia. Death has even occurred at a dosage as low as 0.6 grams (0.021 oz).

Veratrum nigrum contains more than 200 steroid-derived alkaloids, including isorubijervine, jervine, pseudojervine, rubijervine, tienmuliumine, tienmuliluminine, and verazine. The herb causes irritation of mucous membranes. When ingested, the irritation of the mucosal membranes of the stomach and intestines will cause nausea and vomiting. If the herb is introduced to the nose, this mucosal irritation will cause sneezing and coughing. Ingestion can also cause bradycardia (slow heart rate), hyperactivity, and hypotension (low blood pressure). In high concentrations, topical contact can cause skin irritation, excessive tears from the eyes, and redness.

Classic symptoms of Veratrum nigrum toxicity include blurred vision, confusion, headache, lightheadedness, nausea, stomach pain, excessive sweating, and vomiting. In severe cases, heart arrhythmia, muscle cramps, extreme muscle twitching, paresthesia (the feeling of "pins and needles" all over the body), seizures, weakness, and unconsciousness occur. Death may follow.

Toxic symptoms generally resolve themselves after 24 to 48 hours. Supportive treatment for the symptoms is usually administered. Because extreme vomiting occurs, decontamination (e.g., stomach pumping or the ingestion of activated charcoal) is usually not implemented unless ingestion has occurred within one hour. Atropine is usually administered to counteract the low heart rate, and sympathomimetic drugs and liquids administered to raise the blood pressure.

The herb is also a known teratogen. However, no data exists on whether it can cause birth defects in human beings.

== Medicinal usage ==
The dry root of Veratrum nigrum can lower blood pressure and slow heart rate, possibly by stimulating the vagus nerve, if taken in small doses internally. It has been used to treat hypertension and cardiac failure, and to treat pre-eclampsia during pregnancy. It has been found to act as an antibiotic and insecticide. Cyclopamine (11-deoxojervine) is one of the alkaloids isolated from the plant which interferes with the hedgehog signaling pathway (Hh). Cyclopamine is under investigation as a possible treatment for several cancers (such as basal cell carcinoma and medulloblastoma) and skin disorders (such as psoriasis), which result from excessive Hh activity.

The dried rhizomes of Veratrum nigrum have been used in Chinese herbalism. All of the false hellebore species are collectively called "li lu" (藜蘆) in China. Li lu is administered internally as an emetic, and is also used topically to kill parasites (such as tinea and scabies) or to stop itching. It was most widely used to treat vascular disease. Some herbalists refuse to prescribe li lu internally, citing the extreme difficulty in preparing a safe and effective dosage.

== Other uses ==
In Asia, an extract of the herb is mixed with water in a 1 percent to 5 percent solution and used in many rural areas to kill fleas, their larvae, and their eggs in toilets.

== Bibliography ==
- Abercrombie, John and Mawe, Thomas. Every Man His Own Gardener. London: William Griffin, 1773.
- Armitage, A.M. Armitage's Garden Perennials: A Color Encyclopedia. Portland, Ore.: Timber Press, 2000.
- Barceloux, Donald G. Medical Toxicology of Natural Substances: Foods, Fungi, Medicinal Herbs, Plants, and Venomous Animals. Hoboken, N.J.: John Wiley & Sons, 2008.
- Beckett, Kenneth A. The Concise Encyclopedia of Garden Plants. London: Orbis Publishing, 1983.
- Bensky, Dan; Clavey, Steven; and Stöger, Erich. Chinese Herbal Medicine: Materia Medica. 3d ed. Seattle, Wash.: Eastland Press, 2004.
- Bonine, Paul. Black Plants: 75 Striking Choices for the Garden. Portland, Ore.: Timber Press, 2009.
- Carus, Titus Lucretius. Of the Nature of Things. Thomas Creech, ed. London: J. Matthews, 1714.
- Darwin, Charles. The Correspondence of Charles Darwin. Frederick Burkhardt and Sydney Smith, eds. Cambridge, U.K.: Cambridge University Press, 1985.
- Curtis, Samuel. General Indexes to the Plants Contained in the First Fifty-Three Volumes of the Botanical Magazine. London: Edward Couchman, 1828.
- Hobhouse, Penelope. Flower Gardens. London: Frances Lincoln, 2001.
- Huang, Kee C. The Pharmacology of Chinese Herbs. 2d ed. New York: CRC Press, 1998.
- Hulme, F. Edward. Familiar Swiss Flowers, Figured and Described. New York: Cassell, 1908.
- Kingsbury, Noël. Seedheads in the Garden. Portland, Ore.: Timber Press, 2006.
- Martin, Freya. Creating Contrast With Dark Plants. Lewes, U.K.: Guild of Master Craftsman Publications, 2000.
- Nicholson, George; Garrett, John; and Trail, J.W.H. The Illustrated Dictionary of Gardening: A Practical and Scientific Encyclopaedia of Horticulture for Gardeners and Botanists. New York: James Penman, 1887.
- Pelletier, S.W. Alkaloids: Chemical and Biological Perspectives. New York: Wiley, 1983.
- Raven, Sarah. The Bold and Brilliant Garden. London: Frances Lincoln, 1999.
- Thomas, H.H. The Complete Gardener. New York: Cassell and Company, 1916.
- Toogood, Alan R. The Gardener's Encyclopedia of Perennials. New York City: Gallery Books, 1988.
- Van Dijk, Hanneke. Encyclopedia of Border Plants. New York: Routledge, 1999.
