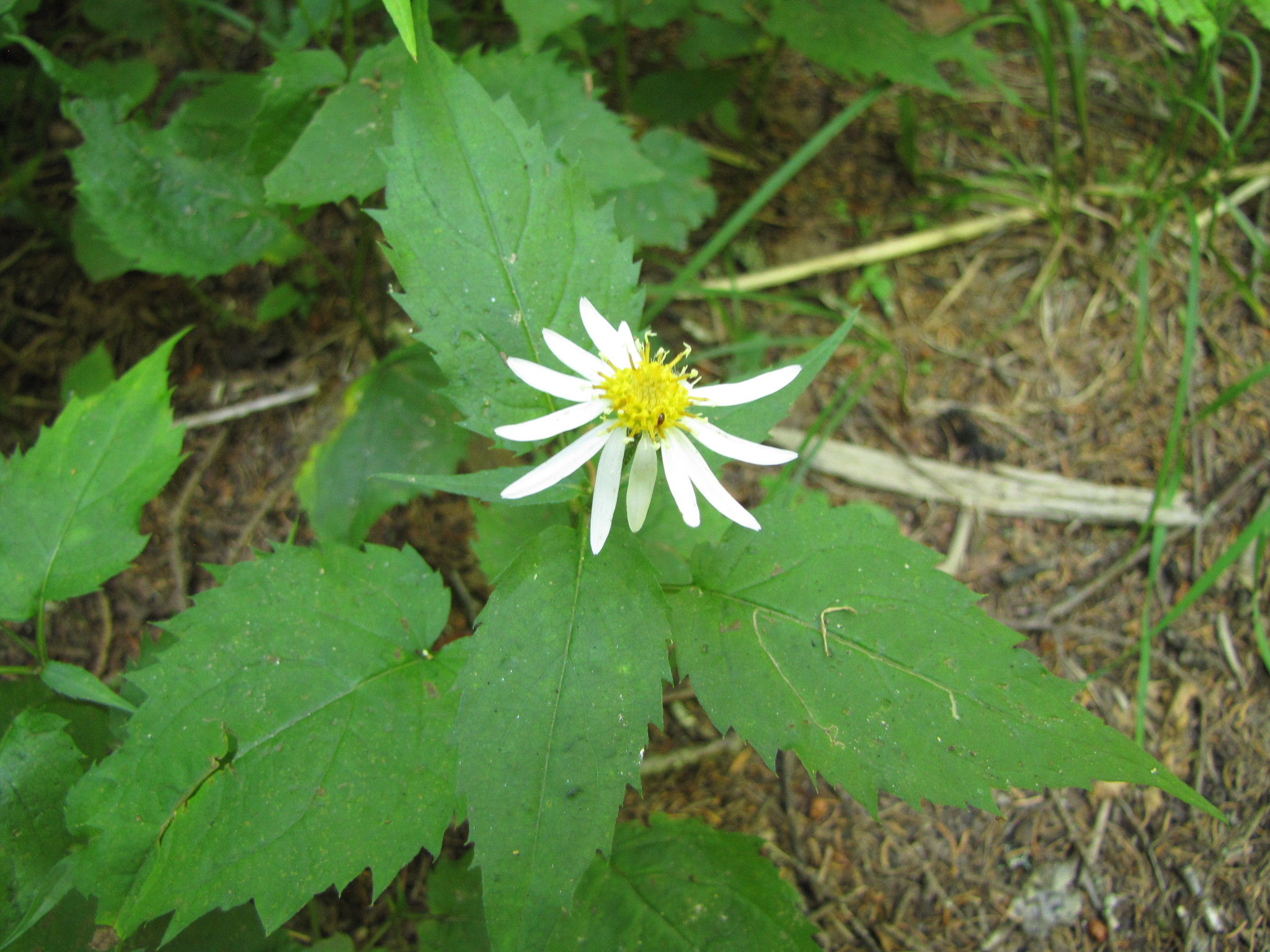

Conservation status
- Apparently Secure (NatureServe)

Scientific classification
- Kingdom: Plantae
- Clade: Embryophytes
- Clade: Tracheophytes
- Clade: Angiosperms
- Clade: Eudicots
- Clade: Asterids
- Order: Asterales
- Family: Asteraceae
- Genus: Eurybia
- Species: E. chlorolepis

Binomial name
- Eurybia chlorolepis (E.S.Burgess) G.L.Nesom

Synonyms
- Aster chlorolepis E.S.Burgess

= Eurybia chlorolepis =

Mountain wood aster

Species of flowering plant

Eurybia chlorolepis, commonly known as the mountain wood aster, mountain aster, or Appalachian heartleaf aster, is a perennial, herbaceous plant native to the southeastern United States. It is present only at relatively high elevations in the Appalachian Mountains. Although it is not considered seriously threatened due to a large number of sites in some of its range, it is often locally endangered and possibly extirpated in the south of its range.

Eurybia chlorolepis reaches 80 cm (32 inches) in height, and spreads by means of underground rhizomes. It has only one stem, becoming woody with age. A single plant produces up to 25 flower heads in a flat-topped array. The flowers appear in late summer through fall. Each head contains 8–20 white or pale lilac ray florets surrounding 12–26 yellow disc florets.

Eurybia chlorolepsis is present in the southern range of the Appalachian Mountains in the southeastern United States. It grows from western Virginia and southern West Virginia in the north, south through eastern Tennessee and the western Carolinas to the northeastern corner of Georgia. It can be found at elevations of 1200 to 2000 metres (4000–6600 feet) in red spruce–Fraser fir forests as well as in cool mixed forests.
