= Melanthium woodii =

- Melanthium woodii in bloom
- Melanthium woodii close-up of flowers

Conservation status
- Secure (NatureServe)

Scientific classification
- Kingdom: Plantae
- Clade: Tracheophytes
- Clade: Angiosperms
- Clade: Monocots
- Order: Liliales
- Family: Melanthiaceae
- Genus: Melanthium
- Species: M. woodii

Binomial name
- Melanthium woodii (J.W. Robbins ex Alph. Wood) Bodkin

Synonyms
- Veratrum intermedium Chapm.; Veratrum woodii J.W. Robbins ex Alph. Wood

Species of flowering plant

Melanthium woodii, common names Wood's bunchflower or Ozark bunch-flower, is a species formerly known as Veratrum woodii. It is native to the central and southeastern parts of the United States, from Arkansas, Florida, Georgia, Illinois, Indiana, Iowa, Kentucky, Missouri, North Carolina, Ohio, Oklahoma and Tennessee. It can be found in forested areas at elevations less than 800 m (2700 feet).

Melanthium woodii is a perennial herb forming bulbs up to 1.6 cm (0.64 inches) and spreading by means of underground rhizomes. Leaves are elliptic to oblanceolate, up to 50 cm long. Inflorescences can be up to 60 cm (2 feet) long. The flowers contain the most distinguishing features of the species, as no other species in the genus has chocolate brown tepals and tomentose young ovaries.
