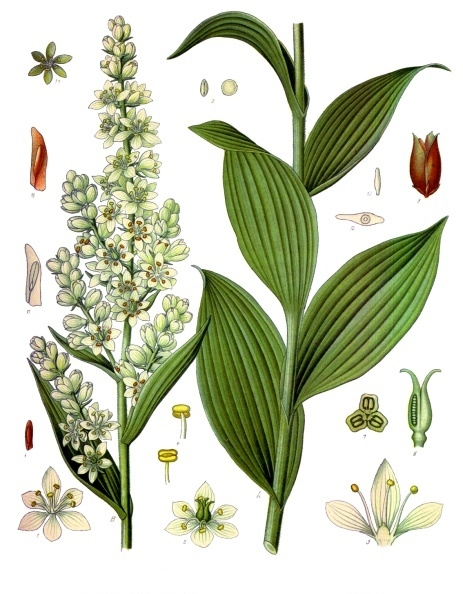
- Veratrum album

Scientific classification
- Kingdom: Plantae
- Clade: Tracheophytes
- Clade: Angiosperms
- Clade: Monocots
- Order: Liliales
- Family: Melanthiaceae
- Tribe: Melanthieae
- Genus: Veratrum; L. 1753

Synonyms
- Melanthium J.Clayton ex L.; Helleborus Gueldenst. 1791, illegitimate homonym not L. 1753 (Ranunculaceae); Leimanthium Willd.; Anepsa Raf.; Evonyxis Raf.; Acelidanthus Trautv. & C.A.Mey.

= Veratrum =

Genus of plants

Veratrum is a genus of flowering plants in the family Melanthiaceae. It occurs in damp habitats across much of temperate and subarctic Europe, Asia, and North America.

Veratrum species are vigorous herbaceous perennials with highly poisonous black rhizomes, and panicles of white or brown flowers on erect stems. In English they are known as false hellebores, false helleborines, and corn lilies. However, Veratrum is not closely related to hellebores, helleborines, maize, or lilies.

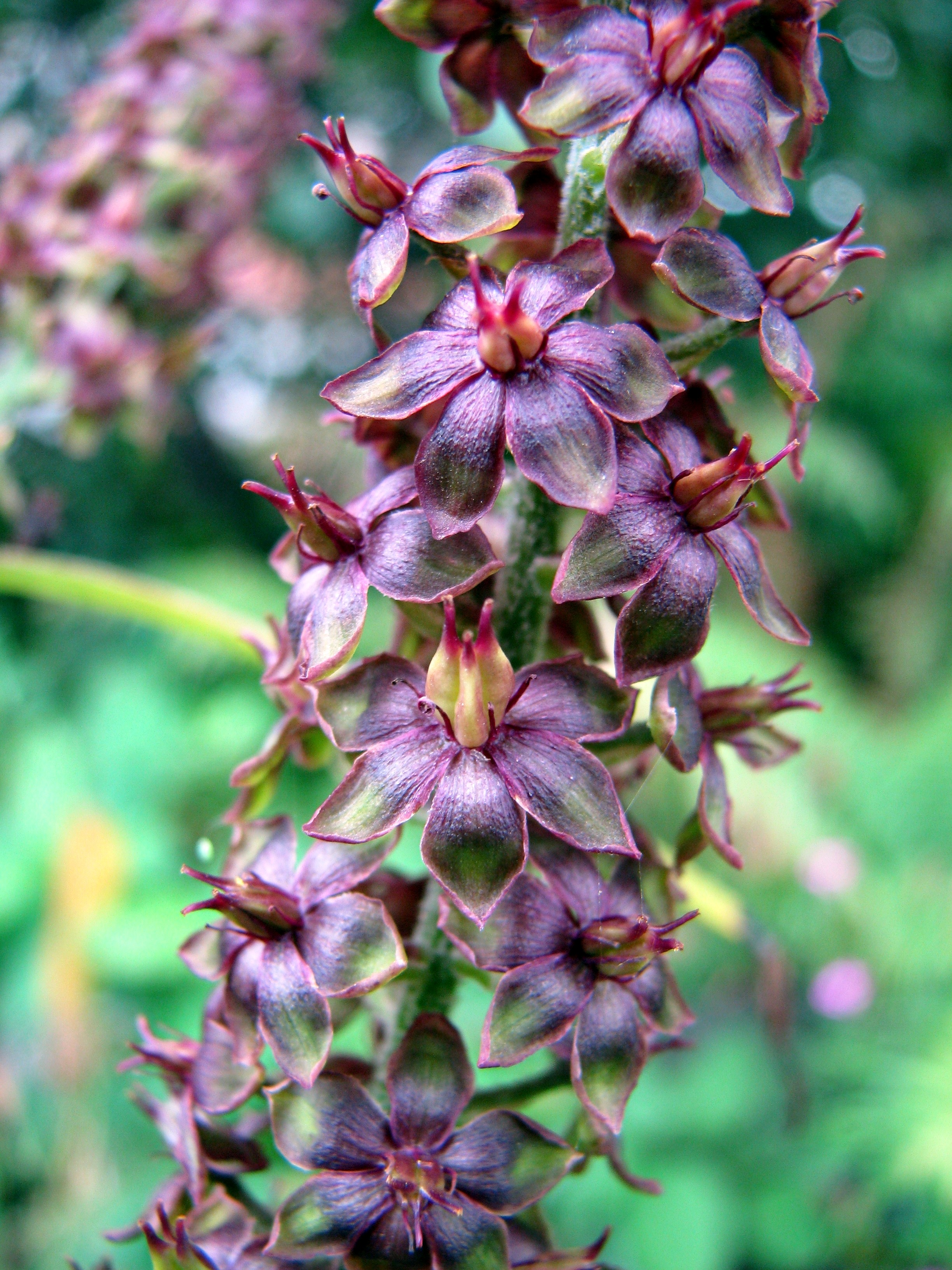
Veratrum nigrum flowers, Poland

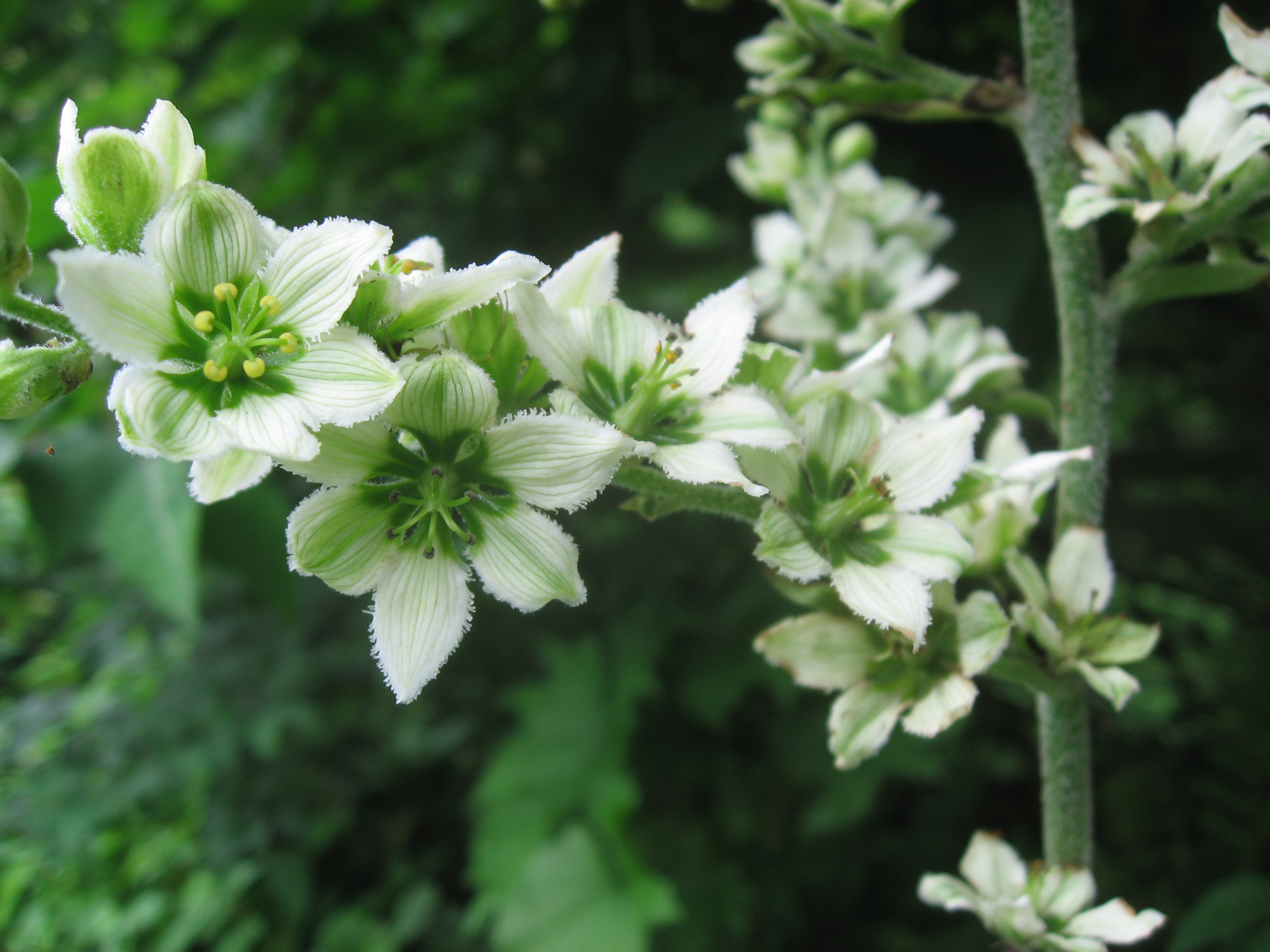
Veratrum album subsp. oxysepalum, Fukushima Prefecture, Japan

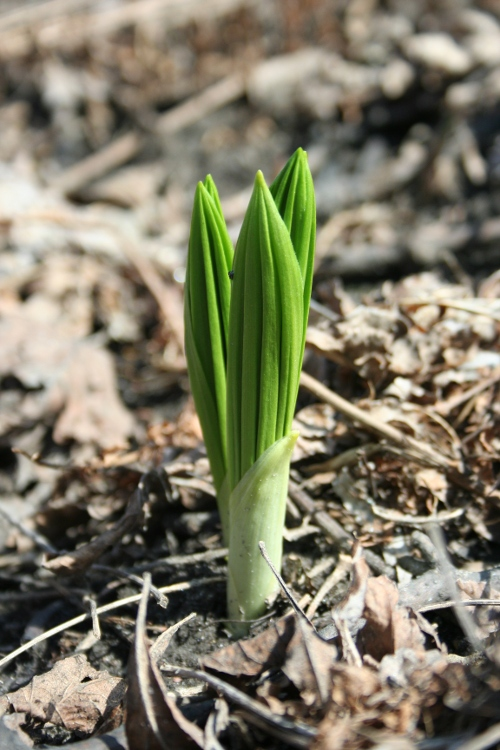
Veratrum viride shoot emerging, Quebec, Canada

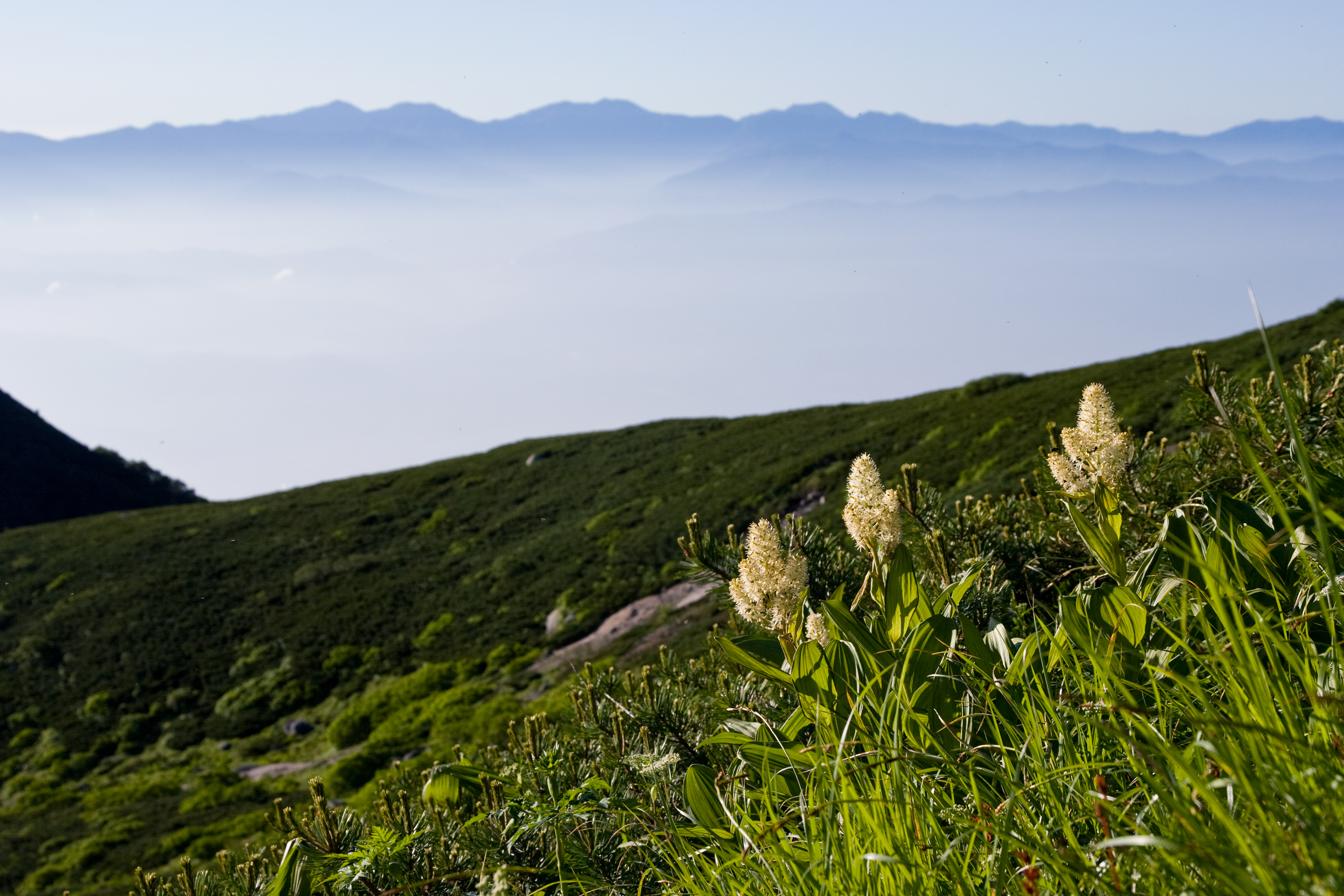
Veratrum stamineum in the mountains of Japan

== Linguistics ==
Veratrum is from the Latin word for "hellebore", of uncertain origin; Anatoly Liberman believes that the reconstructed Proto-Slavic term for the genus Veratrum, *čemerъ, is probably cognate with the English word hemlock, a plant similarly used for poison in antiquity.

== Ecology ==
Veratrum species are used as food plants by the larvae of some Lepidoptera species including Setaceous Hebrew Character.

== Habitat ==
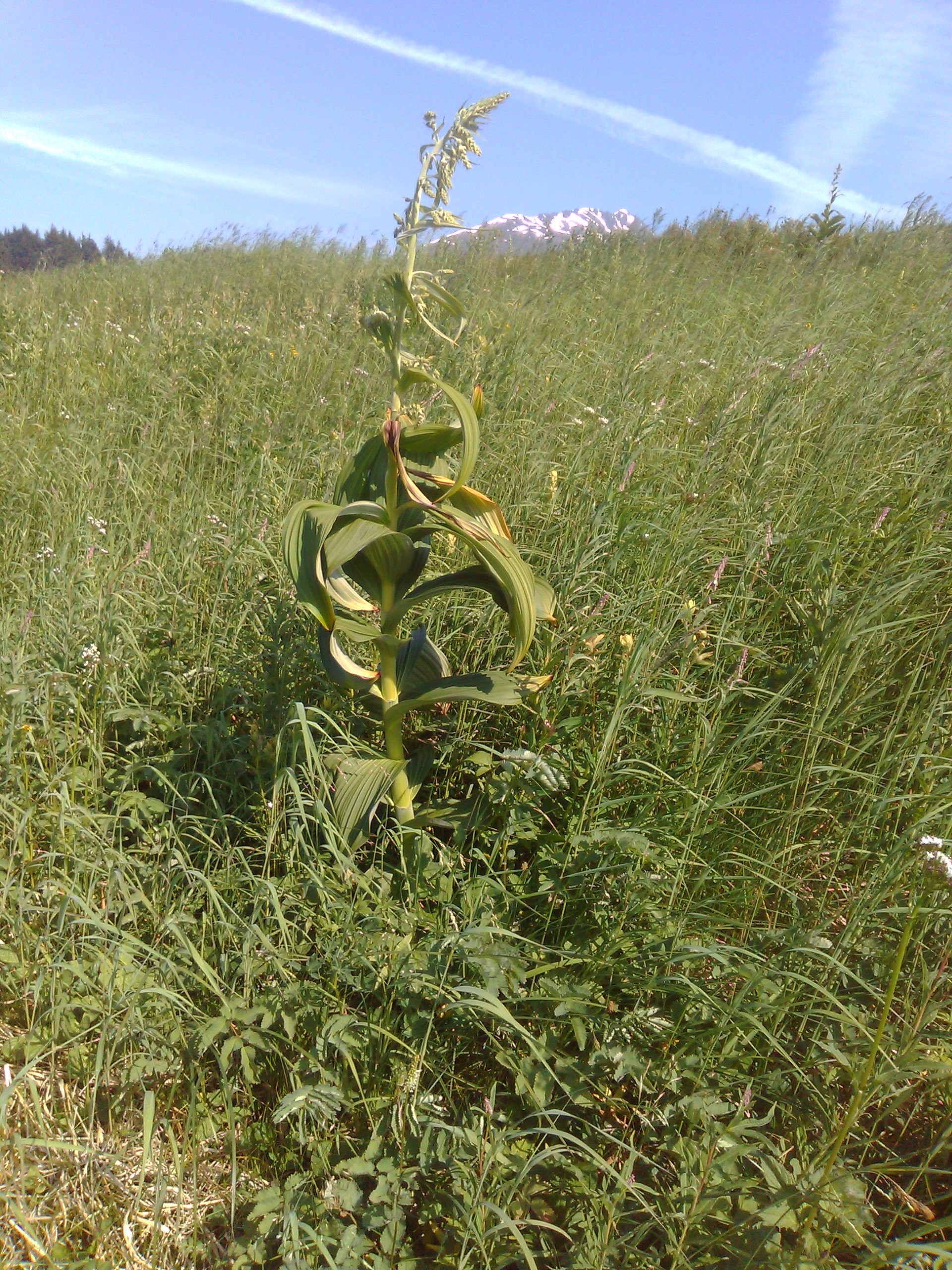
False hellebore growing in its natural habitat, in the wet soils with good drainage of mountainous, alpine-tundra/forest transition-areas, such as Turnagain Pass, Alaska. This plant is roughly 5 feet (1.5 meters) tall, but can reach over 6 feet.

Widely distributed in montane habitats of temperate Northern Hemisphere, Veratrum species prefer full sunlight and deep, wet soils, and are common in wet mountain meadows, swamps, and near streambanks.

== Toxicity ==
Veratrum plants contain highly toxic steroidal alkaloids (e.g. veratridine) that activate sodium ion channels and cause potentially fatal cardiac arrhythmias if ingested. The teratogenic steroid Cyclopamine is also found in these plants and is known to induce holoprosencephaly in farm animals. All parts of these plants are poisonous, with the roots and rhizomes being the most poisonous. If ingested, symptoms, which typically occur between thirty minutes and four hours, include nausea, vomiting, abdominal pain, numbness, headache, sweating, muscle weakness, bradycardia, hypotension, cardiac arrhythmia, and seizures. Treatment for poisoning includes gastrointestinal decontamination with activated charcoal followed by supportive care including antiemetics for persistent nausea and vomiting, along with atropine for treatment of bradycardia and fluid replacement and vasopressors for the treatment of hypotension.

The toxic alkaloids are only produced during active growth, and are degraded and metabolized during the winter months. Native Americans harvested their roots for medicinal purposes during their dormant period.

== Uses ==
Native Americans were well aware of Veratrum's extreme toxicity and used the roots to poison arrows before combat. The roots, when dried and ground into powder, were also used as an insecticide. Western American Indian tribes have a long history of using these plants medicinally, and combined minute amounts of the winter-harvested root of these plants with Salvia dorii to potentiate the effects and reduce the herb's toxicity.

=== Medical research ===
During the 1930s Veratrum extracts were investigated in the treatment of high blood pressure in humans. While initial results were promising, many of the patients suffered side effects due to the narrow therapeutic index of these products. Due to their toxicity and the availability of other less toxic drugs, use of Veratrum as a treatment for high blood pressure in humans was discontinued.

=== Herbal medicine ===
Veratrum plants are known both in western herbalism and traditional Chinese medicine as toxic herbs to be used with great caution. It is one of the medicinals (Li lu, 藜蘆) cited in Chinese herbal texts as incompatible with many other common herbs because of its potentiating effects. Especially, many root (and root-shaped) herbs, particularly ginseng, san qi, and hai seng, will create and or exacerbate a toxic effect.

The roots of V. nigrum and V. schindleri have been used in Chinese herbalism, where plants of this genus are known as li lu. Li lu is used internally as a powerful emetic of last resort, and topically to kill external parasites, treat tinea and scabies, and stop itching. Some herbalists refuse to prescribe li lu internally, citing the extreme difficulty in preparing a safe and effective dosage, and that death has occurred with dosages of as little as 600 milligrams.

== Species ==
Accepted species

- Veratrum albiflorum: Russian Far East
- Veratrum album: Europe, Siberia, Caucasus, Turkey
- Veratrum alpestre: Primorye, Korea, Japan
- Veratrum anticleoides: Russian Far East
- Veratrum californicum: western USA; Mexico (Chihuahua, Durango)
- Veratrum dahuricum: Siberia, Russian Far East, Korea, China
- Veratrum dolichopetalum: Russian Far East, Korea, China
- Veratrum fimbriatum: California (Sonoma + Mendocino Cos)
- Veratrum formosanum: Taiwan
- Veratrum grandiflorum: China
- Veratrum hybridum (syn V. latifolium): eastern United States
- Veratrum insolitum: Washington, Oregon, California
- Veratrum lobelianum: Russia, Mongolia, Xinjiang, Central Asia, Caucasus
- Veratrum longibracteatum: Honshu
- Veratrum maackii: Russian Far East, China, Korea, Japan
- Veratrum mengtzeanum: China, Thailand
- Veratrum micranthum: Sichuan, Yunnan
- Veratrum nigrum: Eurasia from France to Korea
- Veratrum oblongum: Sichuan, Hubei, Jiangxi
- Veratrum oxysepalum: Asiatic Russia, China, Korea, Japan, Alaska
- Veratrum parviflorum: southern Appalachians in eastern USA
- Veratrum schindleri: China
- Veratrum shanense: China, Myanmar
- Veratrum stamineum: Japan
- Veratrum taliense: Sichuan, Yunnan
- Veratrum × tonussii : Italy
- Veratrum versicolor: Korea, China
- Veratrum virginicum: central and eastern United States
- Veratrum viride: northeastern and northwestern North America (but not central)
- Veratrum woodii: south-central United States

== See also ==
- List of plants known as lily
