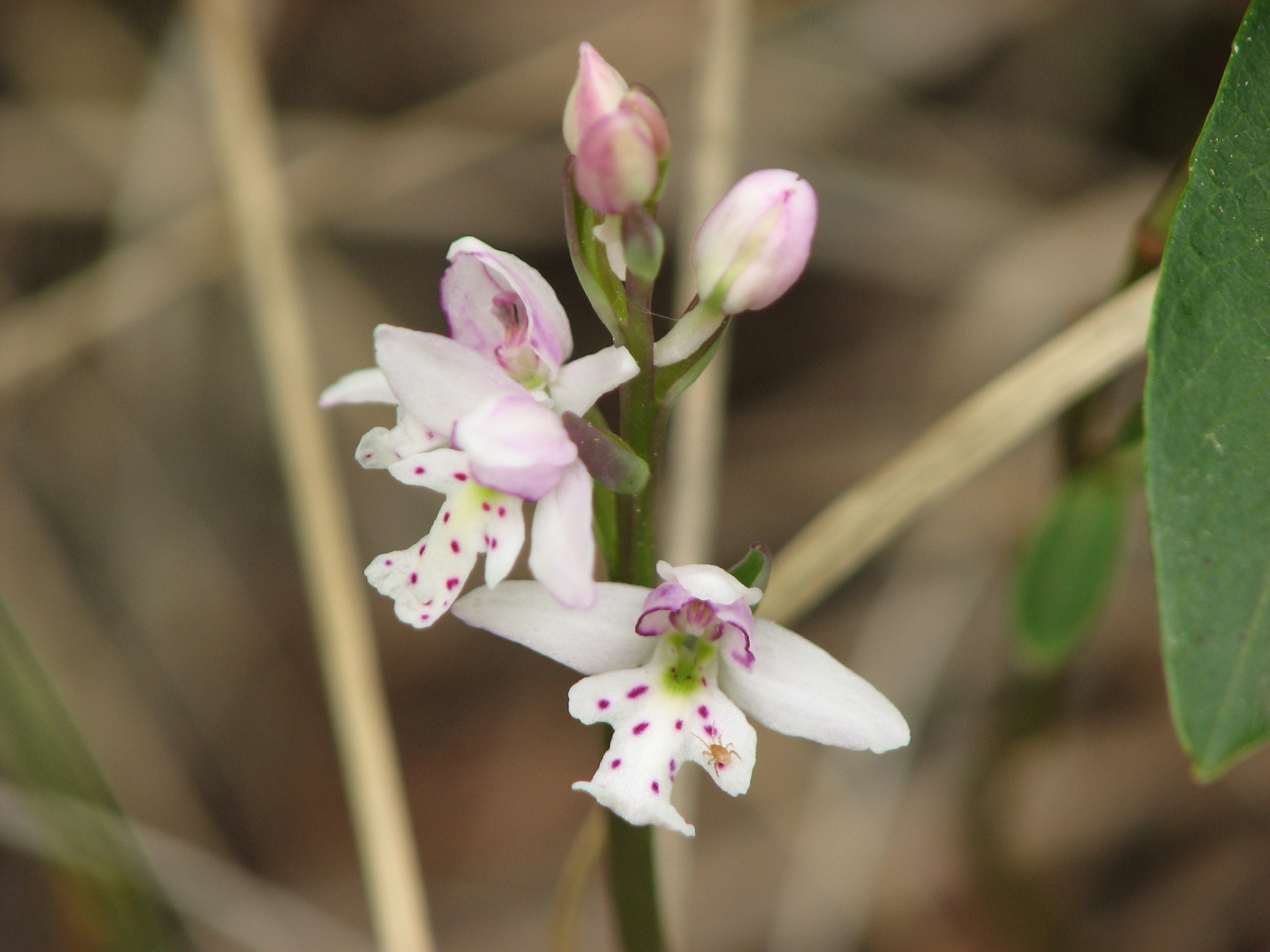
- Galearis rotundifolia Wagner Natural Area, Alberta

Conservation status
- Secure (NatureServe)

Scientific classification
- Kingdom: Plantae
- Clade: Tracheophytes
- Clade: Angiosperms
- Clade: Monocots
- Order: Asparagales
- Family: Orchidaceae
- Subfamily: Orchidoideae
- Genus: Galearis
- Species: G. rotundifolia

Binomial name
- Galearis rotundifolia (Banks ex Pursh) R.M.Bateman

Synonyms
- Orchis rotundifolia Banks ex Pursh; Habenaria rotundifolia (Banks ex Pursh) Richardson; Habenaria rotundifolia (Banks ex Pursh) Lindl.; Platanthera rotundifolia (Banks ex Pursh) Lindl.; Ponerorchis rotundifolia (Banks ex Pursh) Soó; Amerorchis rotundifolia (Banks ex Pursh) Hultén

= Galearis rotundifolia =

Roundleaf orchid

Species of orchid

Galearis rotundifolia is a species of flowering plants in the orchid family, Orchidaceae. It is commonly called roundleaf orchid and small round-leaved orchid. It is a succulent perennial herb native to North America, where it occurs throughout Canada, part of the northern United States, and Greenland.

== Description ==
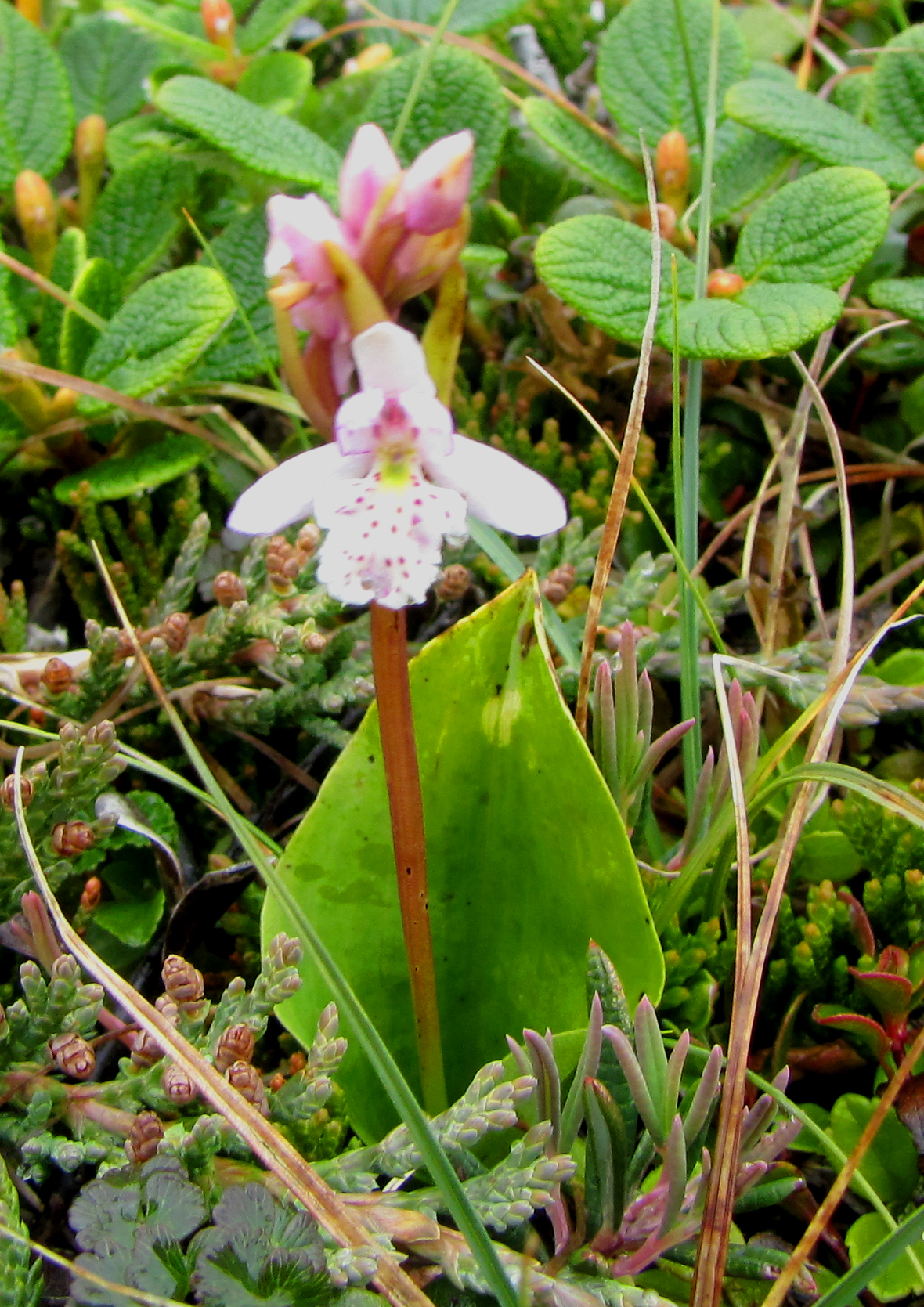
Burnt Cape Ecological Reserve, Newfoundland and Labrador, Canada

Galearis rotundifolia is a succulent perennial herb growing from a fleshy rhizome. It reaches a maximum height around 33 centimeters. A single leaf clasps the base of the stem. It is variable in shape and size, reaching up to 11 centimeters in length. The inflorescence is a spike of flowers and leaflike bracts occupying the top of the stem. The plant produces up to 18 flowers at a time. The flower has six tepals in shades of white or light magenta; three are sepals up to a centimeter long, and three are shorter, narrower petals. The spurred, lobed lip of the middle petal is white with magenta spots and sometimes bars. Flowers bloom June to July. There are two pollinaria, which bear the sticky pollen. The fruit is a capsule.

== Distribution ==
Galearis rotundifolia is native to northern North America, where it is widespread and most abundant at the northern latitudes. It occurs in nearly all of the provinces of Canada, Greenland, Alaska, and the northernmost contiguous United States, including Montana, Minnesota, Wisconsin, Michigan, Idaho, New York, Vermont, New Hampshire and Maine.

== Habitat ==
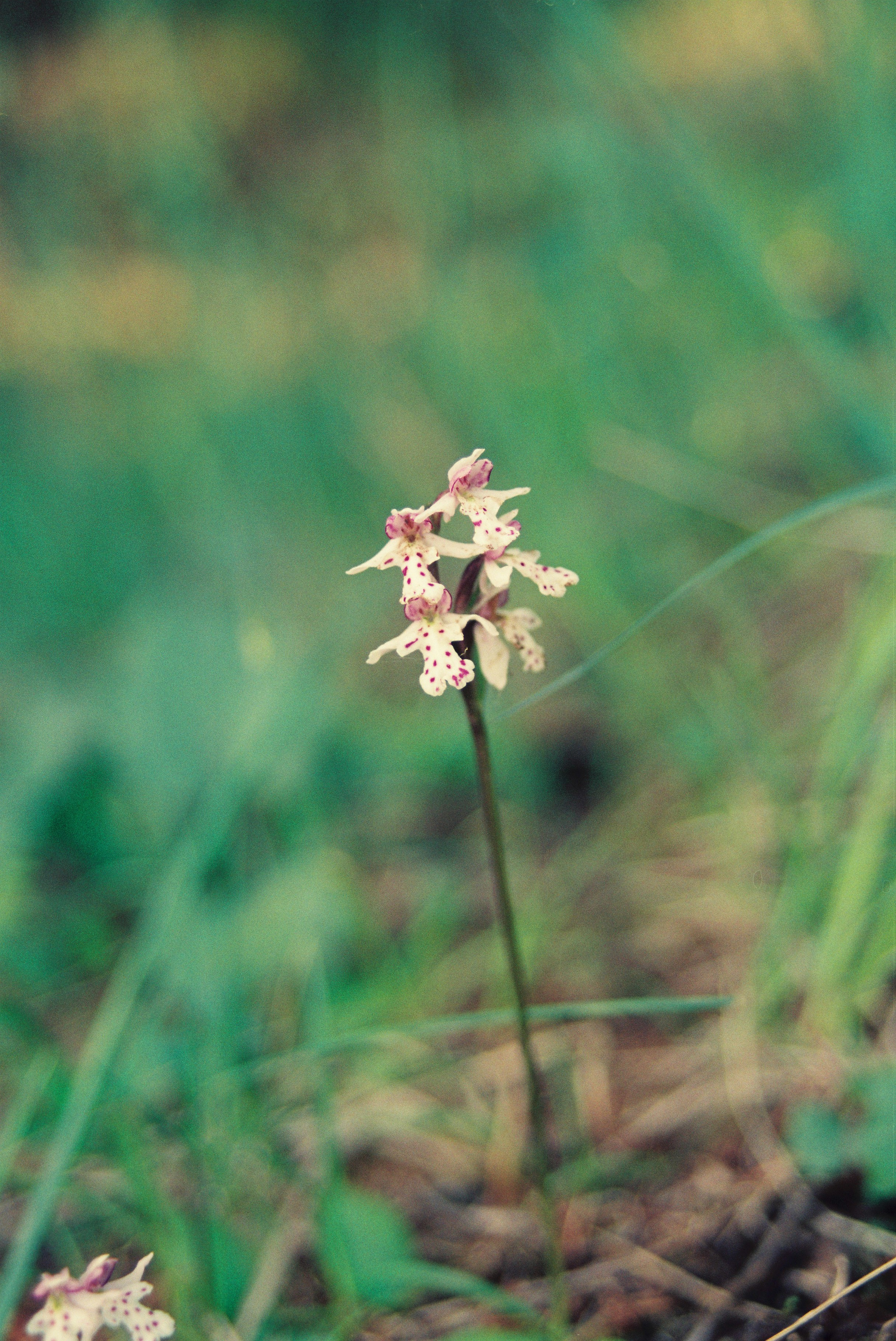
Orchis rotudifolia Banks. — Orchis à feuille ronde. — (Small Round-leaved Orchid). Anticosti Island, Quebec, Canada

Galearis rotundifolia occurs in arctic and boreal climates. In the northern part of its range it is scattered in several habitat types, and in the southern part it is less common and mainly restricted to moist, shady areas. In the Rocky Mountains of Montana, Idaho and Wyoming, for example, it can be found along steams and in wet but well-drained limestone soils in shady spruce forests and woods. It is a glacial relict species.

The most important factor in appropriate habitat is a cold substrate. In northern regions it can grow in full sun, while in southern areas it requires shelter. It is sometimes a dwarf plant in exposed areas on tundra. The substrate is usually also moist to wet, but not waterlogged. It is an obligate wetland species in southern areas, and a facultative wetland plant further north. It also requires calcareous soils with a neutral pH, tolerating only slight acidity.

== Biology ==
Galearis rotundifolia usually reproduces sexually by seed, but it reportedly undergoes vegetative reproduction at times via rhizome or stolon, or perhaps when a ramet is separated from a clonal colony.

The flowers are pollinated by insects. In a survey of pollinators in Alberta, the primary pollinator was Osmia proxima, a mason bee. Other pollinators included several hoverflies, such as Megasyrphus laxus, Eristalis hirta, Eristalis rupium, and Lapposyrphus lapponicus. The insects were observed probing the flower spur with their mouthparts and then getting the sticky pollen wads stuck on their heads as they pushed into the flower. The tiny, light seeds are dispersed on the wind.

Like other orchids, the plant has mycorrhizal associations with fungi in its root system.

== Conservation ==
In general, Galearis rotundifolia is a widespread and secure species, especially in Canada. It becomes rare on the southern fringes of its range. Threats to the species include over-collection by orchid hunters and poaching of the plant for use as a herbal remedy.

== Bibliography ==
- Pridgeon, A.M., Cribb, P.J., Chase, M.C. & Rasmussen, F.N. (2001). Orchidoideae (Part 1). Genera Orchidacearum 2: 290 ff. Oxford University Press.
- Berg Pana, H. (2005). Handbuch der Orchideen-Namen. Dictionary of Orchid Names. Dizionario dei nomi delle orchidee. Ulmer, Stuttgart.
