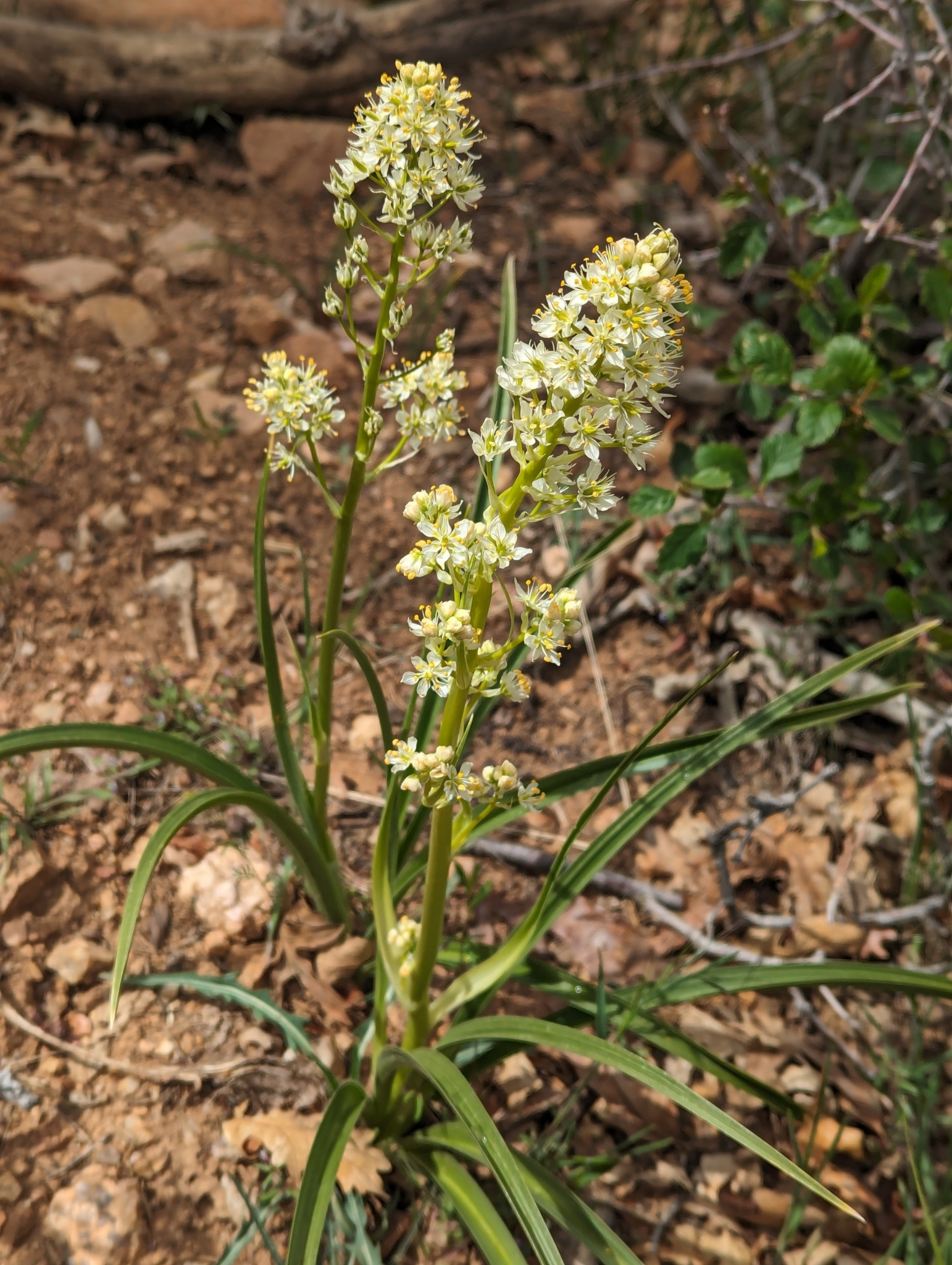
- Flowering in Black Canyon of the Gunnison National Park, Colorado

Conservation status
- Secure (NatureServe)

Scientific classification
- Kingdom: Plantae
- Clade: Tracheophytes
- Clade: Angiosperms
- Clade: Monocots
- Order: Liliales
- Family: Melanthiaceae
- Genus: Toxicoscordion
- Species: T. paniculatum

Binomial name
- Toxicoscordion paniculatum (Nutt.) Rydb.

Synonyms
- Gomphostylis paniculata; Helonias paniculata; Zigadenus paniculatus

= Toxicoscordion paniculatum =

Plant species in the bunchflower family

Toxicoscordion paniculatum is a species of flowering plant known by the common names foothill deathcamas, panicled death-camas, and sand-corn. It is widely distributed across much of the western United States, especially in the mountains and deserts of the Great Basin region west of the Rocky Mountains. It grows in many types of habitats, including sagebrush plateau, grasslands, forests, and woodlands.

== Description ==
Toxicoscordion paniculatum is a flowering bulb plant that grows 20–70 centimeters (8–28 in) tall when blooming. The bulbs are egg shaped, 1.8–4 centimeters tall and 1.2–3.5 cm wide. The bulbs are made up of multiple layers and do not clump together. They are covered in a persistent papery coat that is dark brown to black in color.

Most of the leaves spring directly from the base of the plant at soil level (basal leaves), though they have some attached to the lower part of the flowering stem. The lower leaves are larger, 15–40 cm long and just 5–15 mm wide. The leaves surround the stem, a characteristic called sheathing by botanists. The leaves are arranged in three groups around the central axis of the plant.

The flowers are densely packed on a panicle, an inflorescence that in this species has at least two branches below the main set of flowers. The total number of flowers and buds ranges from ten to eighty. The flowers are a flattened, very open bell that are white to light yellow-white in color. Each flower has six tepals, the outer three a wide egg shape and are not clawed or only barely. The inner three are shaped more like a spear head, 4–5 mm long with a claw less than 1 mm long. The small glands at the base of the tepals is are somewhat heart-shaped and green in color. The six stamens are bright orange and equal in length or slightly longer than the tepals. Plants may flower starting in April and the last plants finishing by the end of June.

The fruit is a dry capsule with three chambers. Each capsule is 5–20 millimeters long and 3–8 mm wide.

Though the flowers being in a panicle is often used as a way to distinguish Toxicoscordion paniculatum from the closely related Toxicoscordion venenosum, the book Vascular plants of the Pacific Northwest by Charles Leo Hitchcock and co-authors advises that the more pointed tepals and having bisexual and unisexual flowers on the same plant are more reliable.

== Taxonomy ==
The first scientific description of Toxicoscordion paniculatum was by Thomas Nuttall in 1834 with the name Helonias paniculata. This was followed by proposed moves to Gomphostylis in 1837 and to Zigadenus in 1871. Per Axel Rydberg proposed moving it and several other species to the new genus Toxicoscordion in 1903. This classification was not widely accepted until 2002, when it was resurrected on the basis of genetic evidence.

As of 2025 the classification as Toxicoscordion paniculatum is widely accepted, including by Plants of the World Online, World Flora Online, and the World Plants database. However, it continues to be listed as Zigadenus paniculatus in many other resources like the USDA Natural Resources Conservation Service PLANTS database (PLANTS) and the Flora of North America.

All of its synonyms are species and homotypic synonyms.

Table of Synonyms
Name	Year	Rank	Notes
Gomphostylis paniculata (Nutt.) Raf.	1837	species	≡ hom.
Helonias paniculata Nutt.	1834	species	≡ hom.
Zigadenus paniculatus (Nutt.) S.Watson	1871	species	≡ hom.

=== Names ===
The species name, paniculatum, refers to the flowers being in a panicle. Toxicoscordion paniculatum is known by the common names of "foothill death camas" or "foothill deathcamas" in English for its habitat. It is also known less frequently as "panicled death camas", a translation of its scientific name. Like many species in the genus, it is also simply called "death camas". It is also called "sandcorn", "sand corn", or "sand-corn" for the tiny bulbils that surround a parent bulb. Very rarely it is called "panicled zigandene", a variation on its former scientific name.

=== Toxicity ===
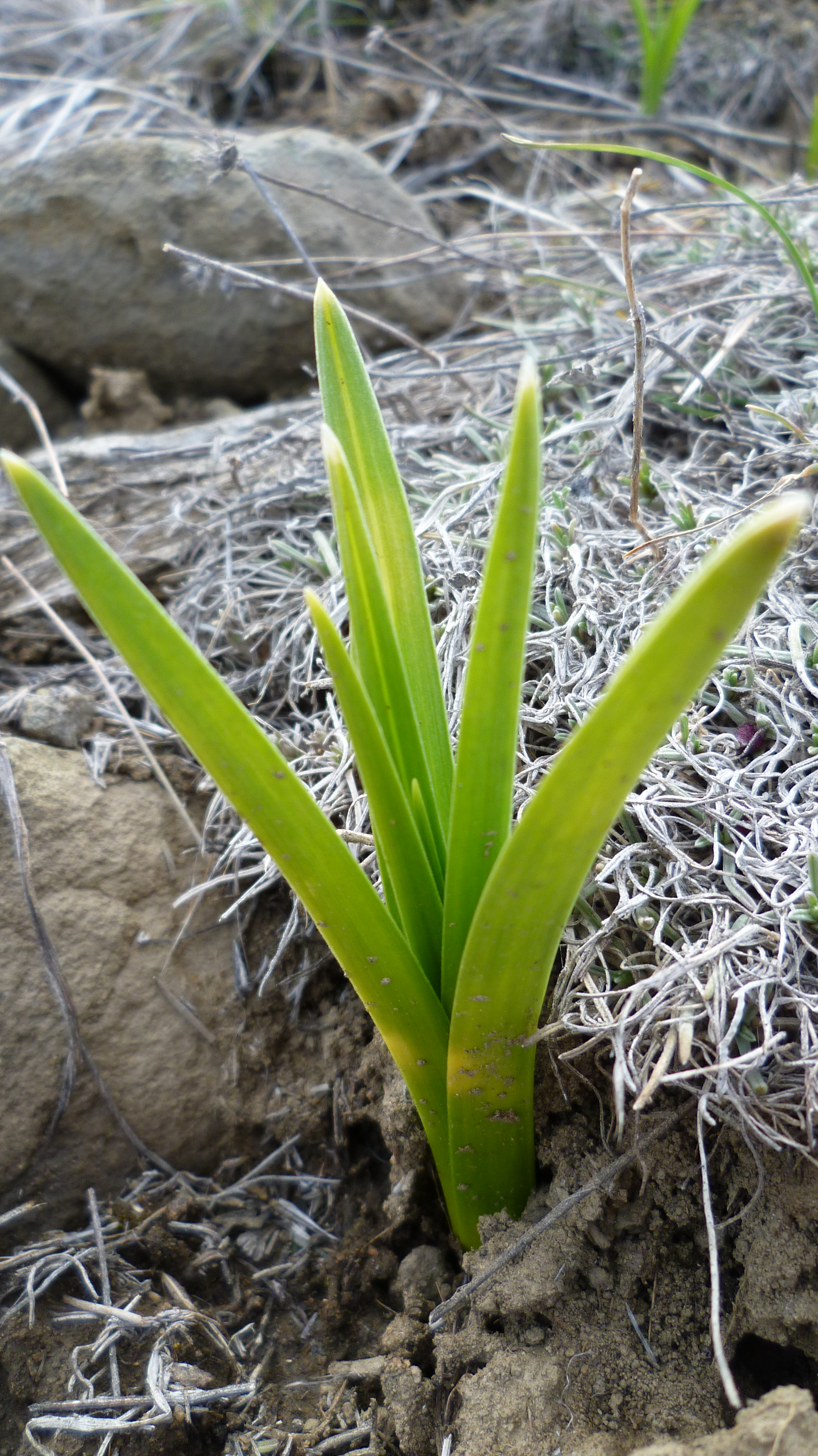
Leaves emerging in the spring

Toxicoscordion paniculatum is infamous for its poisonous qualities in the western United States. All parts of the plant are poisonous, people have even been poisoned by the flowers. However, the most poisonous part is the bulb. Humans that have mistaken the bulbs for those of wild onions or camas and eaten them have been fatally poisoned. In 2003 eight people who mistook the bulbs for that of the edible sego lily (Calochortus nuttallii) were poisoned in Juab County, Utah. Six of them seriously enough to require hospitalization. Horses and cattle tend to avoid the plant and are therefore less commonly poisoned than sheep. Animals are most often poisoned when in pastures containing foothill death camas early in the spring before other plants begin to green up.

== Range and habitat ==
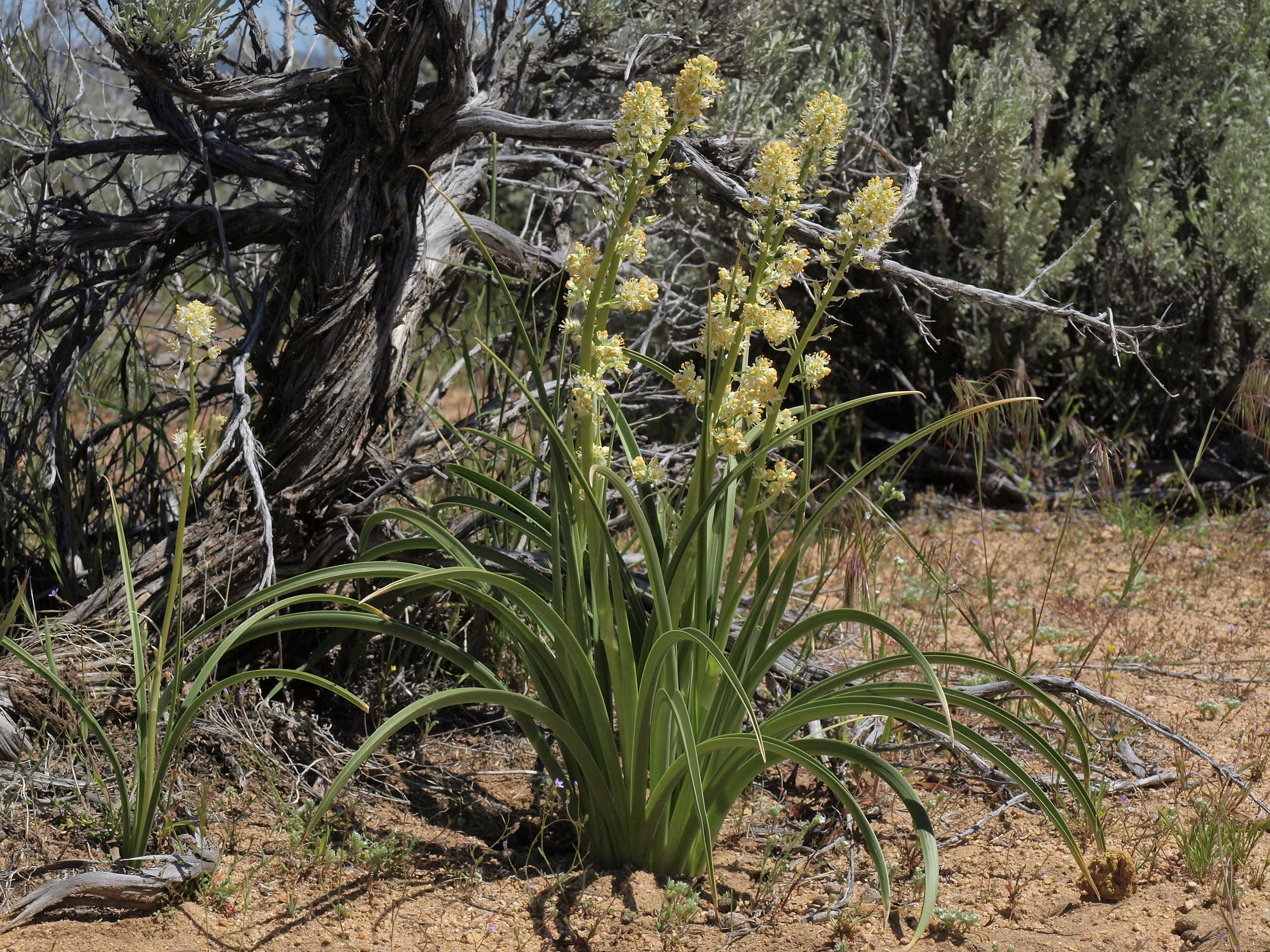
Toxicoscordion paniculatum, Carson Valley, Nevada

Toxicoscordion paniculatum grows in every state of the contiguous United States from the Rocky Mountains westward and into northern Mexico. In the United States it found almost entirely west of the Rocky Mountains in Colorado and New Mexico, while growing in a few scattered, isolated populations in Montana. To the west the foothill death camas grows in every county of Utah and Nevada while mainly growing in the southern portion of Idaho. It is found in the drier eastern areas of both Washington state and Oregon. In California it is found widely north of San Francisco Bay in inland areas of the Northern Coast Ranges and the Klamath Mountains and is found in the Sierra Nevadas from the north to the southern end of the range. It is only found in the northern parts of Arizona. In Mexico it grows in the states of Chihuahua and Sonora.

Foothill death camas is a widespread, but uncommon species. It is normally found scattered across landscapes, but is sometimes grows in dense colonies. Most often it grows on well drained sites in sandy, gravelly, or rocky soils, but is also found in wet loam or dry clay soils. It is found in open, seasonally dry areas such as in ponderosa pine forests, in small clearings amid lodgepole pines, and on sagebrush steppes. It is generally found at lower elevations than Anticlea elegans.

== Ecology ==
The most frequent visitor to its flowers it the death camas bee, but in some locations it is also frequently visited by the bee mimicking black-footed drone fly.

== Uses ==
=== Traditional uses ===
Though well aware of the poisonous nature of the plants, indigenous peoples including the Shoshone, Paiute, and Washoe have made use of crushed bulbs as poultices for a range of aliments. Generally used raw, they were used for rheumatism, sprains, limps, neuralgia, toothache, and swellings. They were used interchangeably with that of Toxicoscordion venenosum by the Paiute who called the two species by the same name.

=== Cultivation ===
The species is occasionally cultivated for its spring blooming flowers. They are grown in well draining areas that are somewhat wet in the spring. The plants tolerate dry conditions making it preferred as a naturalizing plant in dry climates. Foothill death camas can also be intermingled with other bulb plants in perennial boarder gardens. It is hardy in USDA zones 3b–9b.
