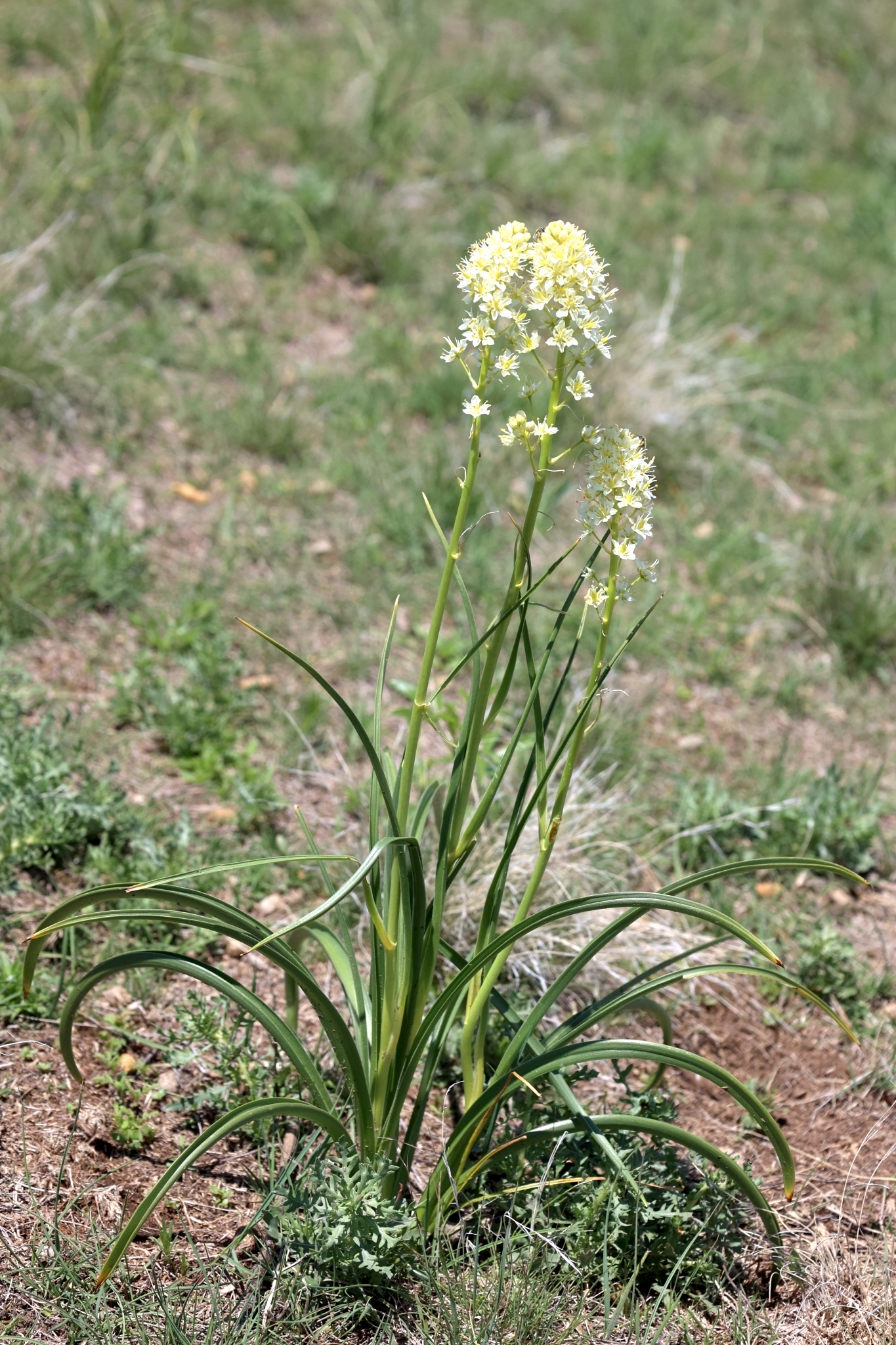
- Toxicoscordion venenosum flowering in the Black Hills, South Dakota

Conservation status
- Secure (NatureServe)

Scientific classification
- Kingdom: Plantae
- Clade: Embryophytes
- Clade: Tracheophytes
- Clade: Spermatophytes
- Clade: Angiosperms
- Clade: Monocots
- Order: Liliales
- Family: Melanthiaceae
- Genus: Toxicoscordion
- Species: T. venenosum

Binomial name
- Toxicoscordion venenosum (S.Watson) Rydb.

Varieties
- Toxicoscordion venenosum var. gramineum (Rydb.) Brasher; Toxicoscordion venenosum var. venenosum

Synonyms
- List: Toxicoscordion acutum (Rydb.) Rydb.; Toxicoscordion arenicola A.Heller; Toxicoscordion falcatum (Rydb.) Rydb.; Toxicoscordion gramineum (Rydb.) Rydb.; Toxicoscordion intermedium (Rydb.) Rydb.; Toxicoscordion salinum (A.Nelson) R.R.Gates; Zigadenus acutus Rydb.; Zigadenus falcatus Rydb.; Zigadenus gramineus Rydb.; Zigadenus intermedius Rydb.; Zigadenus diegoensis Davidson; Zigadenus salinus A.Nelson; Zigadenus venenosus S.Watson

= Toxicoscordion venenosum =

Western North American flowering plant

Toxicoscordion venenosum, with the common names death camas and meadow death camas, is a species of flowering plant in the family Melanthiaceae. It grows up to 70 centimetres (27 1/2 in) tall. Both its common names and its scientific name reference its toxic qualities.

The species is native to western North America. Because its nectar is poisonous, it is mainly pollinated by the death camas miner bee.

== Description ==
Toxicoscordion venenosum is a bulb plant 20–70 centimetres (8–27 1/2 in) tall when flowering in the spring or early summer. The underground bulbs are egg-shaped (ovoid) and tunicate, made up of multiple layers protected by dried outer layers like an onion.

The plant's leaves appear very early in the spring and are narrow. Most of the leaves are basal, springing directly from the ground, though a few much smaller ones may attach to the flowering stem. The length of the leaf blade is 12–50 cm (4 1/2–19 1/2 in) long while only being 2–10 millimetres (1/8–3/8 in) wide. The leaves are sharply folded into a "V" shape along their length, quite unlike the leaves of wild onions, with a keel, a ridge at the bottom of the fold.

=== Flowering ===
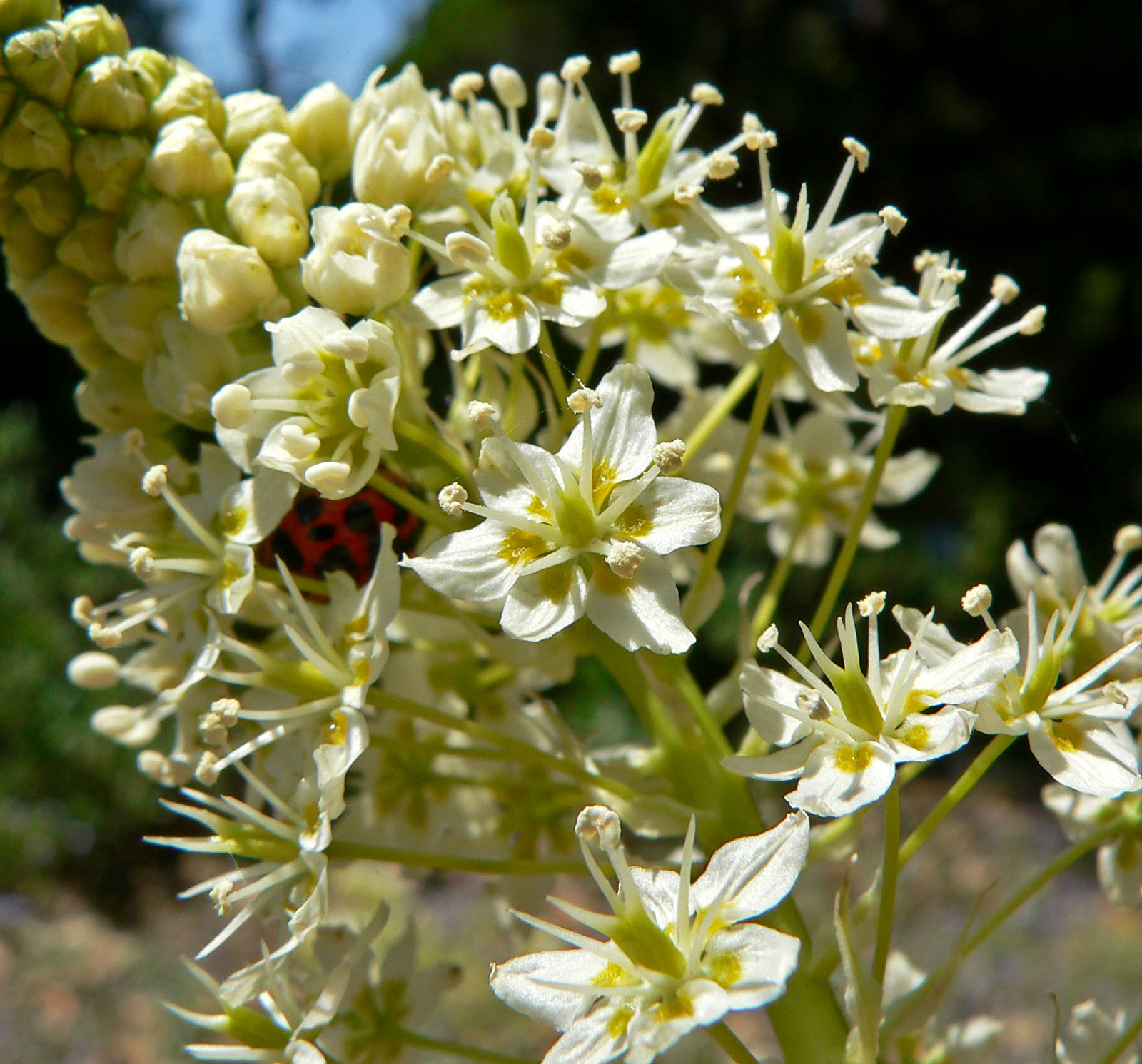
Toxicoscordion venenosum var. venenosum flowers at the University of California Botanical Garden, Berkeley

The inflorescence usually does not have branches and is a raceme, but will sometimes have one or two branches near the base and be a panicle. If a plant does have branches, they will be one tenth to one third the length of the stem. It may be as much as 20 cm (8 in) long, or as short as 2 cm (3/4 in). There may be ten to fifty flowers on the flowering stem. The top of the flowering stem will be pyramidal in shape when blooming begins with smaller buds and immature flowers towards the top and open flowers towards the base.

The flowers are off-white and resemble six pointed stars. The petals and sepals are very similar to each other and so are often called tepals. Together they are called a perianth and are 5–10 mm (1/4–3/8 in) in diameter. The outer three tepals are egg shaped (ovate) and strongly curved inward while the inner three are shaped more like a spear head (lanceolate) and are more yellow or yellowish-green than the outer three. Each flower has six stamens each as long or slightly longer than the tepals. The bracts on the back of the flowers may be green or white and are 5–25 mm (1/4–1 in) long. Flowering may commence in April, May, June, or as late as July in its native habitat.

The fruit is a capsule 8–20 mm (1/4–3/4 in) long and 4–7 mm (1/8–1/4 in) wide. The tepals persist into fruiting. The seeds are 5–6 mm long and light brown in color.

A diploid, its chromosome count is 2n = 22.

=== Similar species ===
The closely related foothills death camas (Toxicoscordion paniculatum) has a very similar appearance, but with smaller flowers, more open clusters, and multiple flowers on each stemlet (a panicle).

== Taxonomy ==
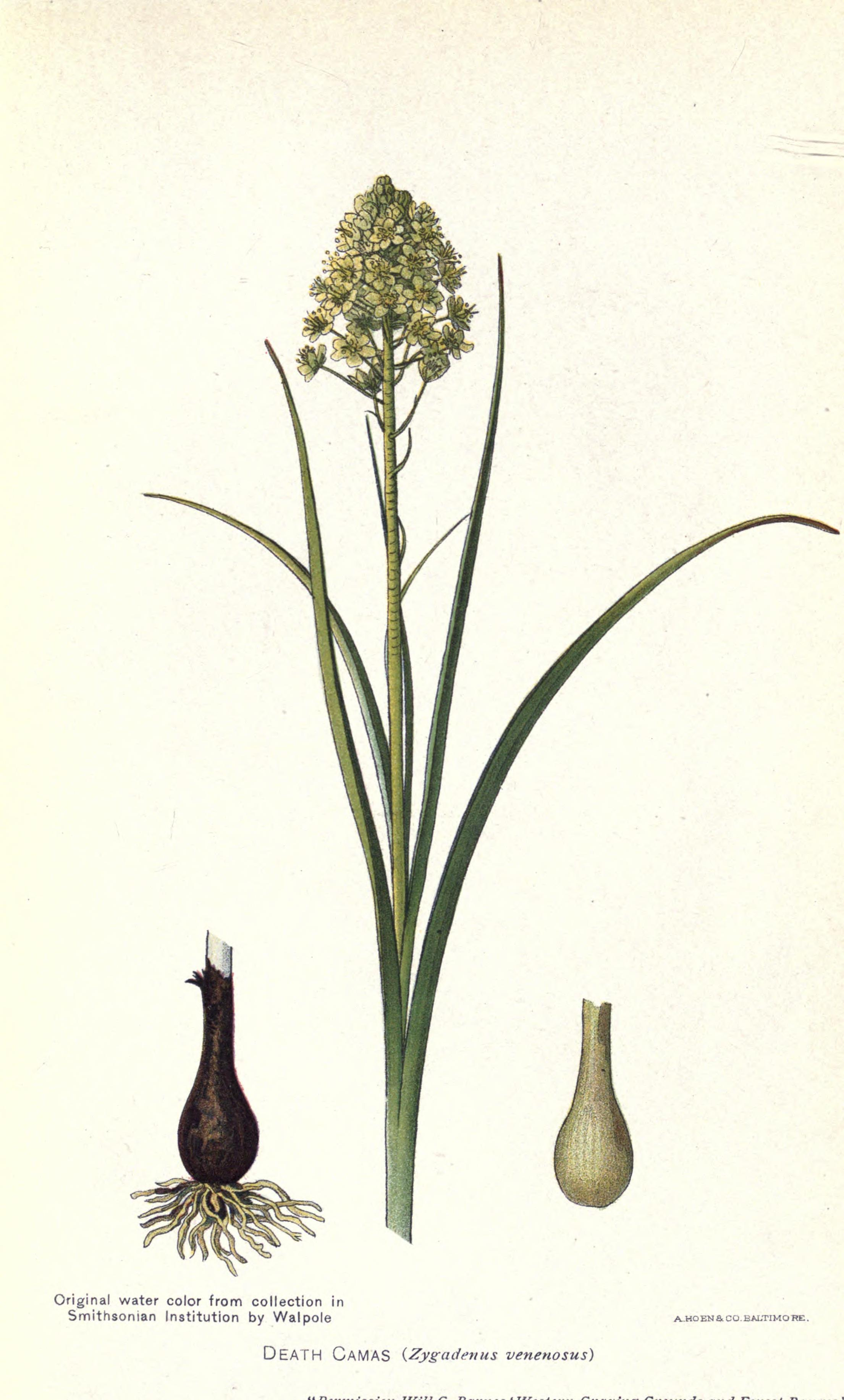
Toxicoscordion venenosum illustrated as Zigadenus venenosus by Frederick Andrews Walpole

Toxicoscordion venenosum was given its first scientific name, Zigadenus venenosus, and described by Sereno Watson in 1879. The botanist Per Axel Rydberg proposed the new genus Toxicoscordion in 1903 and placed the species there. Most sources in the 20th century continued to classify it in Zigadenus, however genetic research published in 2002 resurrected the genus Toxicoscordion.

As of 2024 this is the accepted name according to Plants of the World Online and World Flora Online. However, many sources such as the Flora of North America still list it as Zigadenus venenosus.

=== Varieties ===
Two varieties of this species are accepted.

==== Toxicoscordion venenosum var. gramineum ====
This variety was first described by Per Axel Rydberg as a species named Zigadenus gramineus in 1900. However, it was generally recognized as a separate species until the 21st century. This variety is differentiated by more often having branches on it flowering stems and the outer tepals being less curved (clawed) than in var. venenosum. It is found in the Pacific Northwest, Colorado, Canada, and the northern plains, much more widely spread than the other variety.

==== Toxicoscordion venenosum var. venenosum ====
The autonymic variety almost never has branches on its flowering stem, at most having just one branch. The outer tepals of the flowers are clawed and 5 millimeters long. It is found on the west coast of North America from British Columbia to Baja California in Mexico. It is not found further east than Nevada, Idaho, or Utah.

=== Names ===
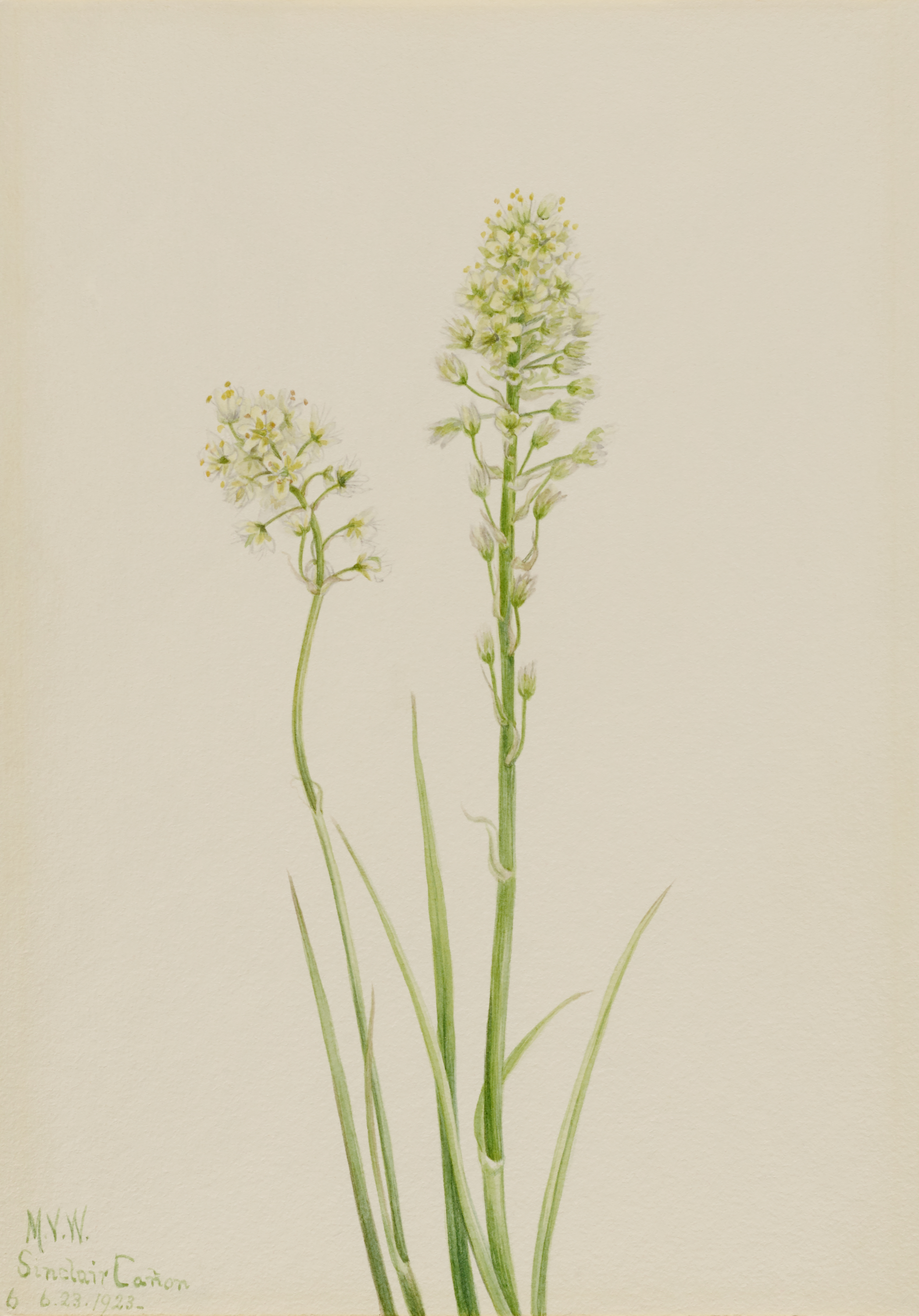
Watercolor by Mary Vaux Walcott

The genus name Toxicoscordion is derived from Greek and means "poison garlic". The species portion of its binomial name, venenosum, appropriately translates as "very poisonous". In English it is often simply called "death camas", a name also applied to other species in the genus. More specifically it is known as "meadow death-camas" to distinguish it from other related plants. The variety gramineum is sometimes called "grassy deathcamas". The "camas" part of its name is due the resemblance of the bulbs to those of the edible Camassia flowers. Other common names include "poison onion" and "poison camas".

In the Northern Pomo language all members of the genus including this species are called "tsim’bu" meaning "harmful bulb". Likewise in the Umatilla language from along the Columbia River this species is called "alapíšaš", but the related Toxicoscordion paniculatum and even Anticlea elegans may have also been called by this name. In the Ktunaxa language of British Columbia it is called "nupqasaquǂ" ("nup-ka-sa-qush"). In the Lushootseed language of South Puget Sound it is called "ba'q'a'".

== Distribution and habitat ==
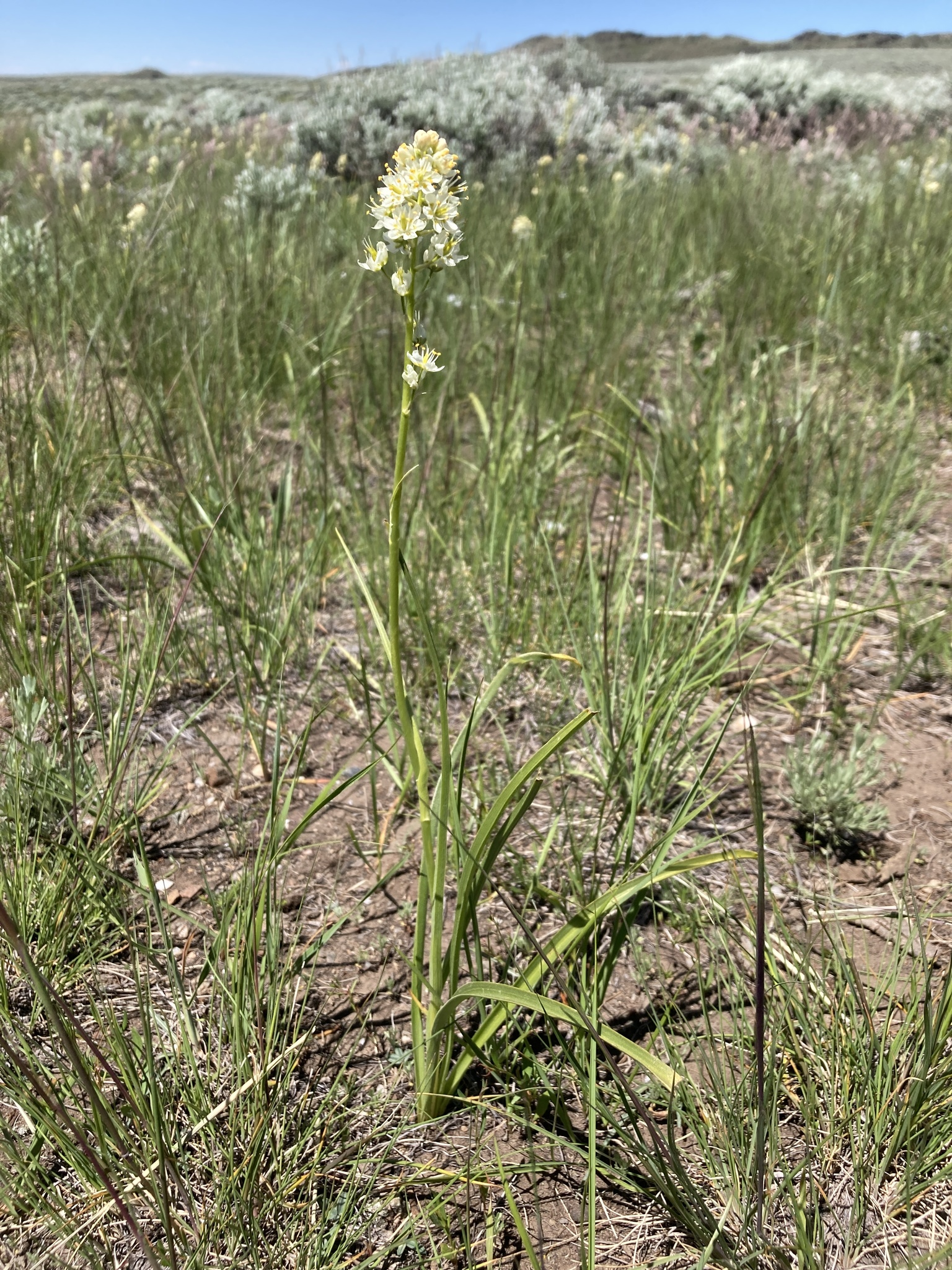
T. venenosum blooming in a sagebrush steppe, Wyoming

Meadow death camas is found through much of western North America. In Canada it is found in three western provinces: Alberta, British Columbia, and Saskatchewan. In the United States, it grows from the West Coast to the Rocky Mountains (with the exception of Arizona). This includes California, Colorado, Idaho, Montana, Nebraska, Nevada, New Mexico, North Dakota, Oregon, South Dakota, Utah, Washington, and Wyoming. It also grows in the Mexican state of Baja California.

The meadow death camas grows in more open, sunny habitats. The variety venenosum grows in grasslands and open pine woodlands of the interior from 500 to 1,300 metres (1,600 to 4,300 ft). The variety gramineum grows in well drained grasslands and coastal areas from sea level to as much as 2,500 m (8,200 ft). They prefer wet areas, but can grow in much drier habitats than common camas (Camassia quamash) such as on hillsides in the Sierra Nevada. They may also be found in opening in coniferous forests and among the sagebrush of the interior.

== Ecology ==
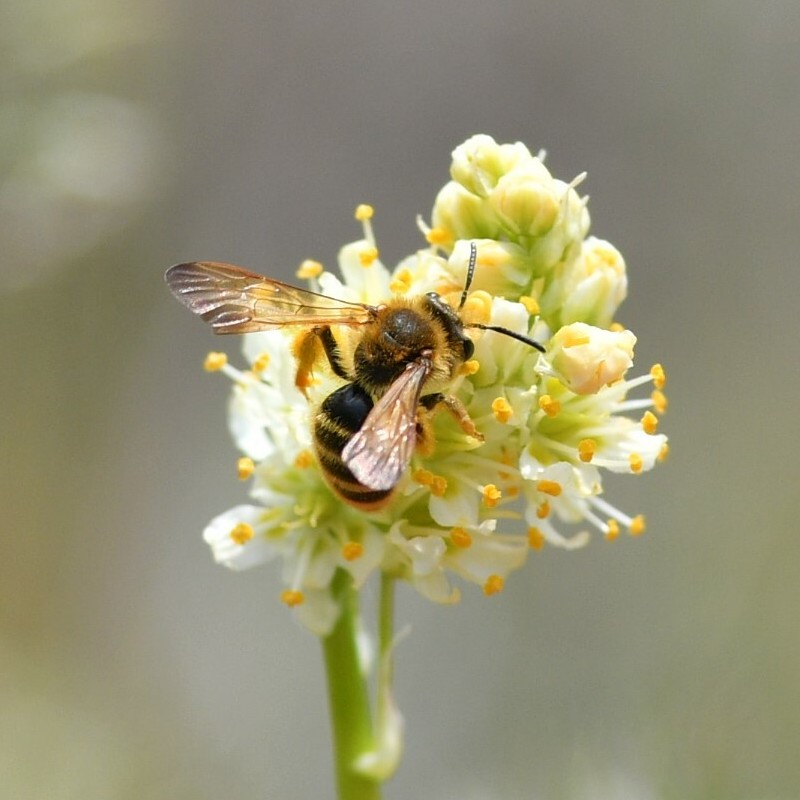
The death camas bee (Andrena astragali) in British Columbia

The nectar is also poisonous; controlled experiments have shown that honeybees can be fatally poisoned by the flowers, and it or its relative are suspected in a few cases of honeybee poisonings. The plant is visited by a specialist miner bee, the death camas miner bee (Andrena astragali), which is likely the only bee that can tolerate its toxins. In turn the bee is an oligolege, a species that specializes in the pollen of only a few species of flower. The death camas miner bee specializes in meadow death camas and the closely related Toxicoscordion paniculatum. Seed production for the plant is also significantly increased by bees visiting the flowers. Theories as to what advantages specialization and toleration of the toxicity of the nectar and pollen provide include that the lack of competitors for the food resources provided by the flowers and that, as with the monarch butterfly, ingesting toxic food protects the bees from predators and parasites by making them toxic.

Though the death camas bee is the only bee that feeds upon death camas flowers, a fly species, Earomyia melnickae, was described in 2022 which was discovered feeding on the meadow death camas flowers. As of 2024 it is unknown where or what the species may feed upon as a larva. Extensive searches were made on the bulbs in the area where the flies were discovered, but no signs of feeding or larvae were discovered. It is also unknown if they contribute to pollination of the flowers to any degree.

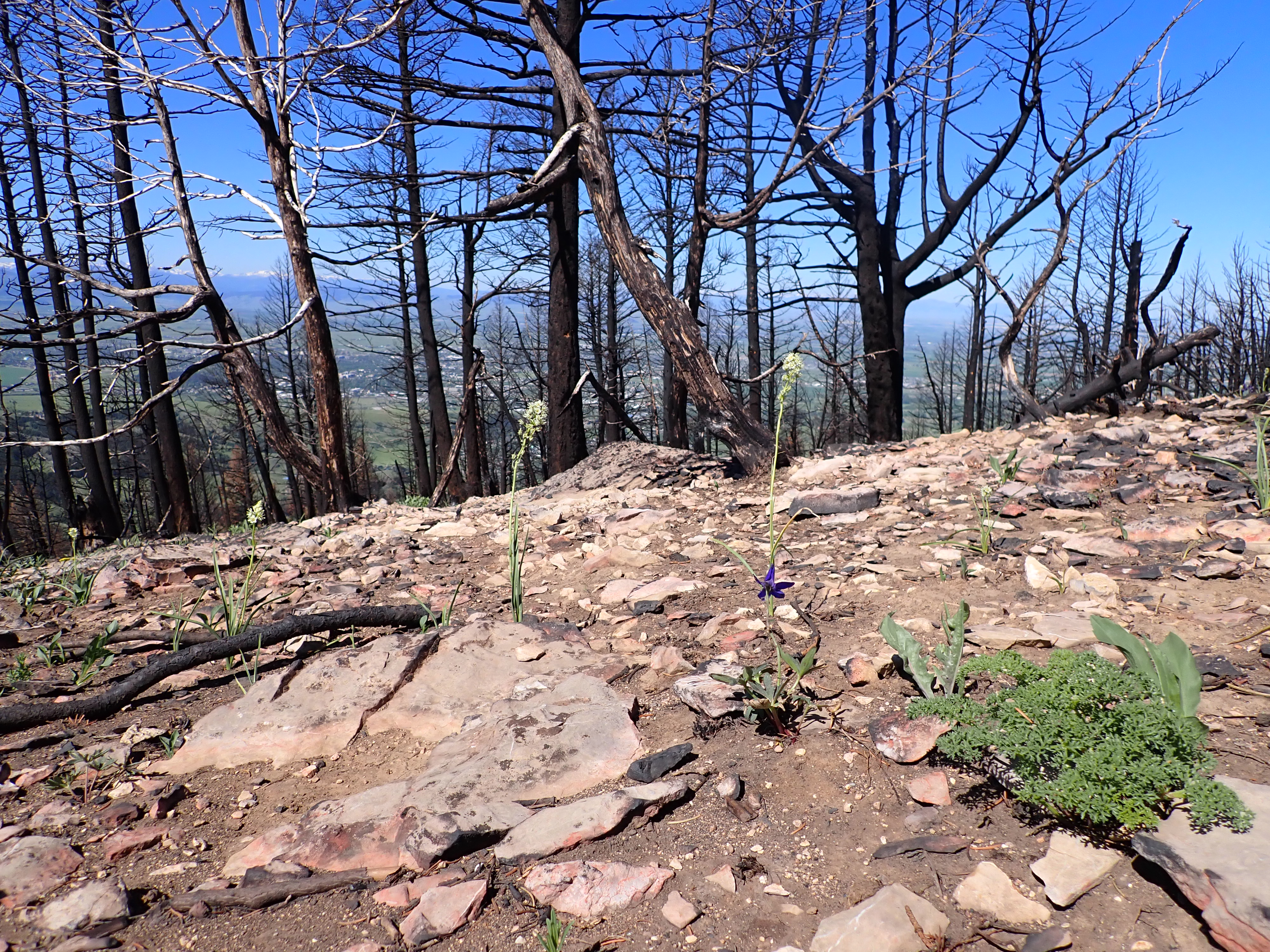
Resprouting the summer following a fire in Montana

As a bulb plant, it survives fires easily. Though plants that are actively growing will be consumed in a fire the bulb will survive and regenerate. When dormant the bulbs are apparently entirely unaffected by fires. They grow in a variety of habitats with different fire intervals, from as infrequent as more than 400 years between fires to as frequent as yearly fires in some ponderosa pine forests.

== Conservation ==
When evaluated by NatureServe in 2015 it was found to be "Secure" at the global level (G5). They also found it to be secure in British Columbia, Montana, and Wyoming (S5) and "Apparently Secure" (S4) in the provinces of Alberta and Saskatchewan.

== Toxicity ==
Toxicoscordion venenosum has a well-deserved poisonous reputation. The main toxic alkaloid contained in the plants is zygacine, but other esters of zygadenine develop in the plant as the seed pods ripen. While they are not easily confused with other species while in bloom they can easily be mistaken for edible bulbs like those of the camas lily in the Pacific Northwest once the leaves and flowering stems have faded. As few as two bulbs are sufficient to kill a fully-grown human, with the poisons not degraded by cooking. The toxins also remain stable when dried and stored, with bulbs remaining toxic for two decades after collection. The seeds and the bulbs are the most toxic parts of the plants. A survivor of poisoning said of the experience, "My mouth got tingly, and later the sensation moved down my throat."

Human poisonings are rare. Symptoms of poisoning are numerous. The first symptom is watering of the mouth followed by numbness of the lips and mouth. Other possible gastric symptoms include thirst, nausea, stomach pain, vomiting, and diarrhea. Circulatory, nervous, and muscular symptoms may include a headache, muscular weakness, confusion, slow and/or irregular heartbeat, low blood pressure, below normal temperature, difficulty breathing, convulsions, or coma. In severe cases, the coma can lead to death. The onset of symptoms ranges from one to eight hours after consumption. Meadow death camas has been mistaken for a number of edible bulb species including blue camas, wild onions, and mariposa lily.

The plant is also deadly to livestock, with sheep being most commonly poisoned. However, pigs are reported to vomit the plant and avoid being fatally poisoned. The lethal dose of green plant material is between 0.6% and 6.0% of an animal's body weight. In experiments with sheep it was among the most poisonous of members of its genus with just 0.4% of green material by body weight causing symptoms, close to the 0.2% of Toxicoscordion nuttallii. And material from T. venenosum var. gramineum was almost as equally fatal at just 0.6% compared with 0.5% for T. nuttallii. As a plant develops towards flowering the levels of zygacine decrease in the plant. The plants tend to have higher levels of poison in dry locations and in years with less rainfall.

== Uses ==
=== Traditional uses ===
Though well aware of the poisonous nature of the plants, the indigenous Paiute people have made use of crushed bulbs as poultices for a range of ailments in an identical manner to Toxicoscordion paniculatum, which they called by the same name. It was used for burns, rattlesnake bites, rheumatism, and swellings.

The naturalist Ira Noel Gabrielson dismissed the species and all of its relatives (except for Toxicoscordion fremontii) as a cultivated plant due to lacking "charm enough to take up room in a garden when so many more beautiful things are available". Despite this, the species is occasionally grown in wildflower meadows or perennial borders for its spring flowers in either full sun or partial shade. Due to the toxic nature of it and all its relatives, caution is urged to avoid planting it where herbivores would have access. In the Manual of Bulbs from the Royal Horticultural Society it is listed as tolerating winter temperatures at least as cold as −15 °C (5 °F). It is hardy in USDA zones 3b–9b.
