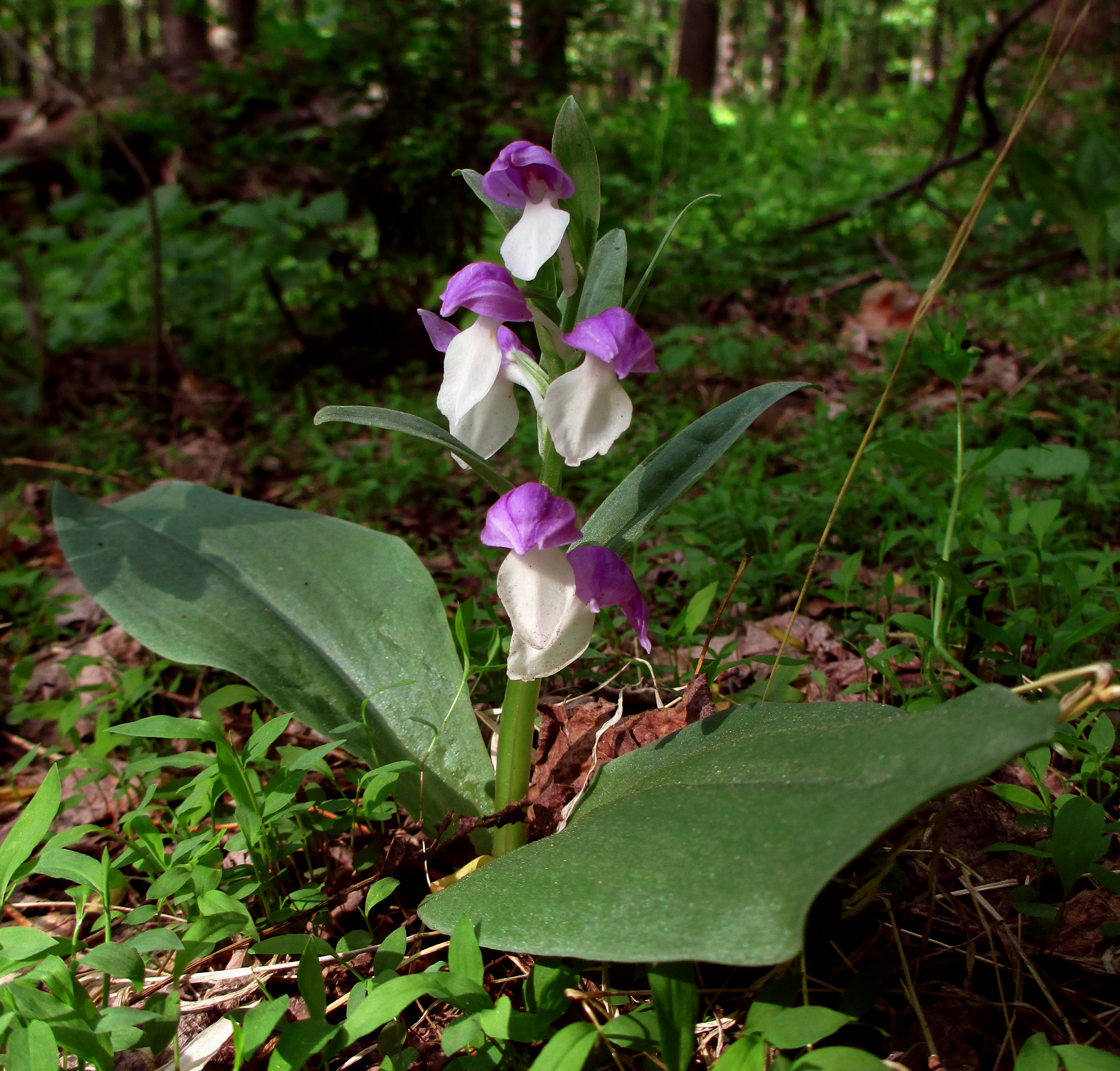
- Galearis spectabilis (showy orchis)

Scientific classification
- Kingdom: Plantae
- Clade: Embryophytes
- Clade: Tracheophytes
- Clade: Spermatophytes
- Clade: Angiosperms
- Clade: Monocots
- Order: Asparagales
- Family: Orchidaceae
- Subfamily: Orchidoideae
- Tribe: Orchideae
- Subtribe: Orchidinae
- Genus: Galearis; Raf.

Type species
- Galearis spectabilis (L.) Raf.

Synonyms
- Amerorchis Hultén; Galeorchis Rydb. in N.L.Britton; Aceratorchis Schltr.; Chondradenia Maxim. ex F.Maek.; Aorchis Verm.

= Galearis =

Genus of orchids

Galearis is a genus of the orchid family (Orchidaceae) native to North America and eastern Asia. It contains about ten recognized species. The family name comes from the Greek word orchis ('testicle'), in reference to the shape of the root.

== Species ==
Image	Scientific name	Distribution	Elevation (m)
	Galearis camtschatica (Cham.) X.H.Jin, Schuit. & W.T.Jin	Japan, Korea, Russian Far East	
	Galearis cyclochila (Franch. & Sav.) Soó	China (Jilin, Qinghai), Japan, Korea, Russian Far East	1,000–2,900 metres (3,300–9,500 ft)
	Galearis fauriei (Finet) P.F.Hunt	Japan (Honshu)	
	Galearis huanglongensis Q.W.Meng & Y.B.Luo	Sichuan	
	Galearis roborovskyi (Maxim.) S.C.Chen, P.J.Cribb & S.W.Gale	China, Tibet, Nepal, eastern Himalayas	2,800–4,900 metres (9,200–16,100 ft)
	Galearis rotundifolia (Banks ex Pursh) R.M.Bateman	Canada, Greenland, northern United States	0–1,200 metres (0–3,937 ft)
	Galearis spathulata (Lindl.) P.F.Hunt	China, Himalayas, Nepal, Myanmar	2,800–4,500 metres (9,200–14,800 ft)
	Galearis spectabilis (L.) Raf.	eastern Canada; eastern and central United States	0–1,500 metres (0–4,921 ft)
	Galearis tschiliensis (Schltr.) P.J.Cribb, S.W.Gale & R.M.Bateman	China ( Hebei, Shanxi, Qinghai, Sichuan)	3,200–4,100 metres (10,500–13,500 ft)
	Galearis wardii (W.W.Sm.) P.F.Hunt	China including Tibet	2,400–4,500 metres (7,900–14,800 ft)
