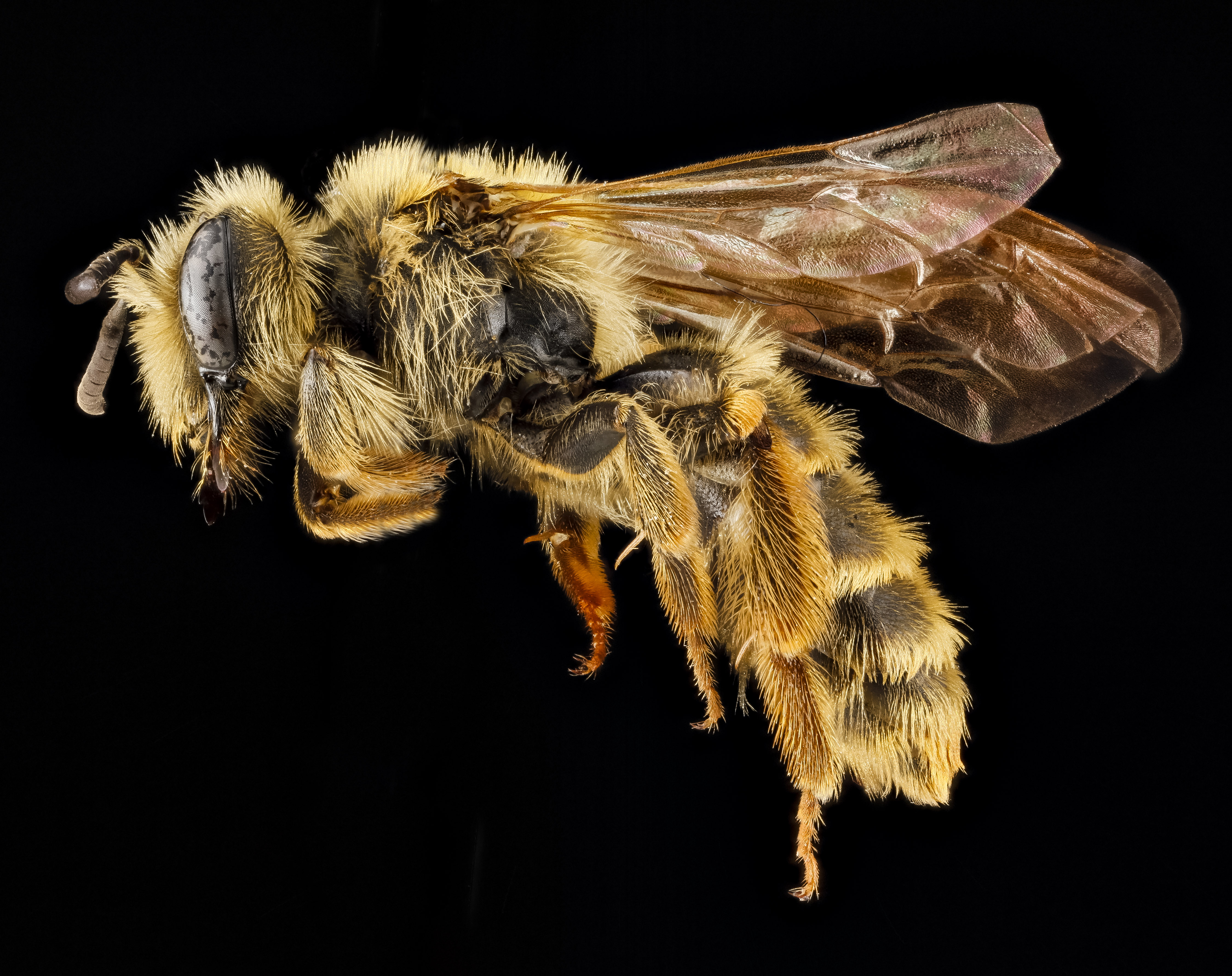

Scientific classification
- Kingdom: Animalia
- Phylum: Arthropoda
- Clade: Pancrustacea
- Class: Insecta
- Order: Hymenoptera
- Family: Andrenidae
- Genus: Andrena
- Species: A. astragali

Binomial name
- Andrena astragali Viereck & Cockerell, 1914

Synonyms
- Andrena zygadeni Cockerell, 1932

= Andrena astragali =

Species of miner bee in the family Andrenidae

Andrena astragali, the death camas miner bee or death camas bee, is a species of miner bee in the family Andrenidae. It is found in North America. It specializes in feeding on the highly poisonous Toxicoscordion venenosum, the meadow deathcamas, and close relatives. It is quite likely the only bee that can tolerate the death camas's toxin, zygacine.

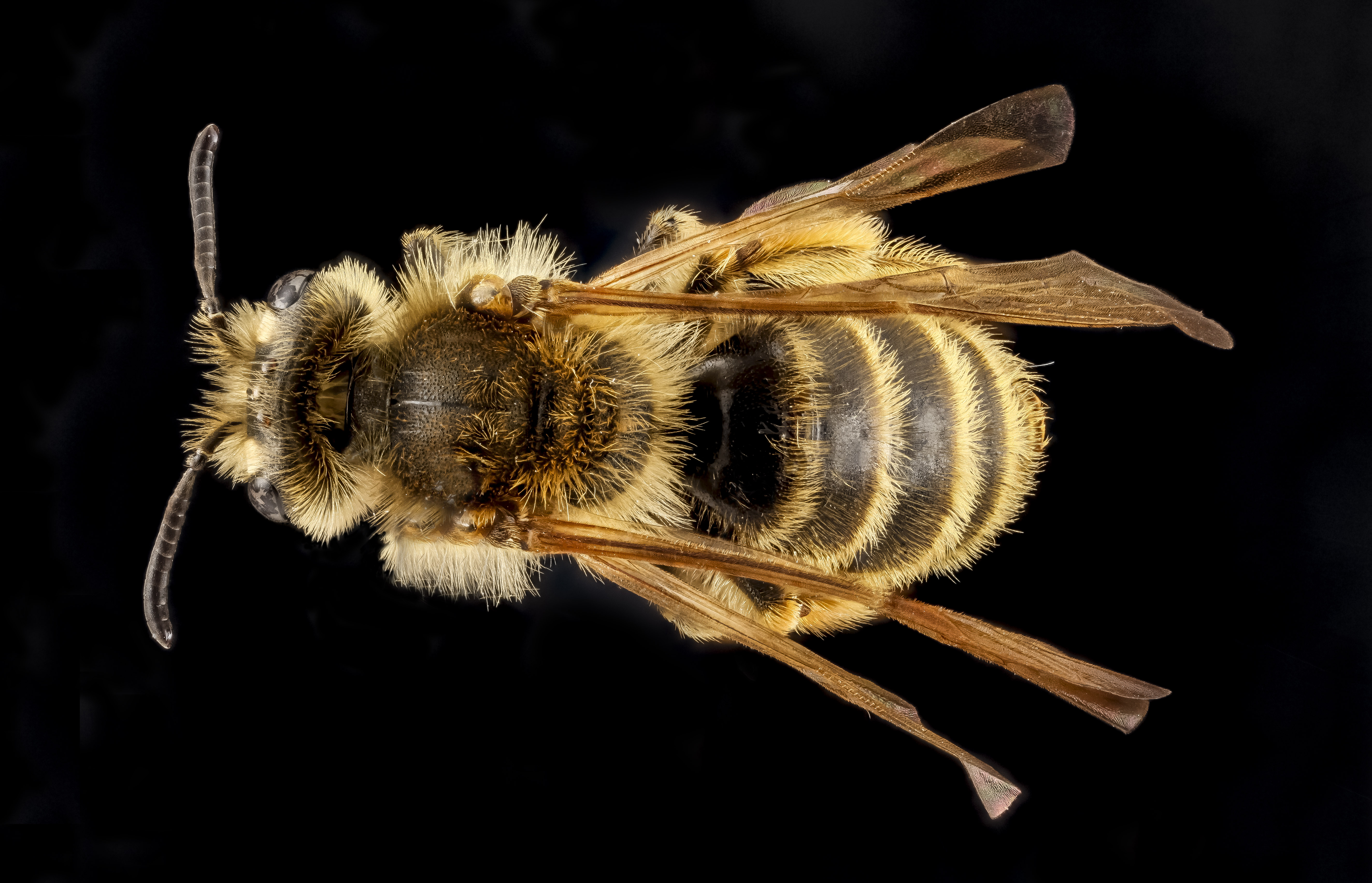
Death camas bee, Andrena astragali, dorsal view

== Taxonomy and phylogeny ==
A. astragali is a bee, a species in the order Hymenoptera, which includes wasps, bees, and ants. It is in the family Andrenidae, and the subfamily Andreninae. Its genus, Andrena, is one of the largest genus of bees and its members are solitary ground dwelling mining bees. The species was first described by two entomologists with the University of Colorado Boulder, Henry Lorenz Viereck and Theodore D. A. Cockerell, who published the first description of the species in 1914. It was inadvertently named a second time as Andrena zygadeni by Cockerell from specimens collected in California feeding on flowers of the plant then named Zigadenus fremontii, now Toxicoscordion fremontii.

=== Names ===
The species name, A. astragali, is referring to the genus Astragalus, the locoweeds. The first specimen collected by Viereck and Cockerell, was found on one of those flowers in Nebraska. They named the species assuming that was primarily or exclusively a pollinator of that genus, when in fact they mostly visit Toxicoscordion flowers and the bee collected was an outlier. The species has a number of common names related to its specialized feeding behaviors. In English it is called the "death camas bee" and "death camas miner bee" because it is a specialist pollinator of flowers in the deathcamas genus (Toxicoscordion). Much less commonly, it is occasionally called the "death camas andrena".

== Description ==
The female is about 10–13 millimeters in length with a black body and reddish to creamy white hairs. The male's body length is slightly shorter, ranging from 8–12 millimeters.

The facial quadrangle is broader than it is long. The wings are glassy with a reddish tint, but without a dark margin and dusky at the apex. A. astragali is different than other American Andrena in the western United States by being larger and having two toothlike projections on the labrum, the flap in front of the mouth parts. It is most visually similar to Andrena fulvida, a European species.

=== Foraging ===
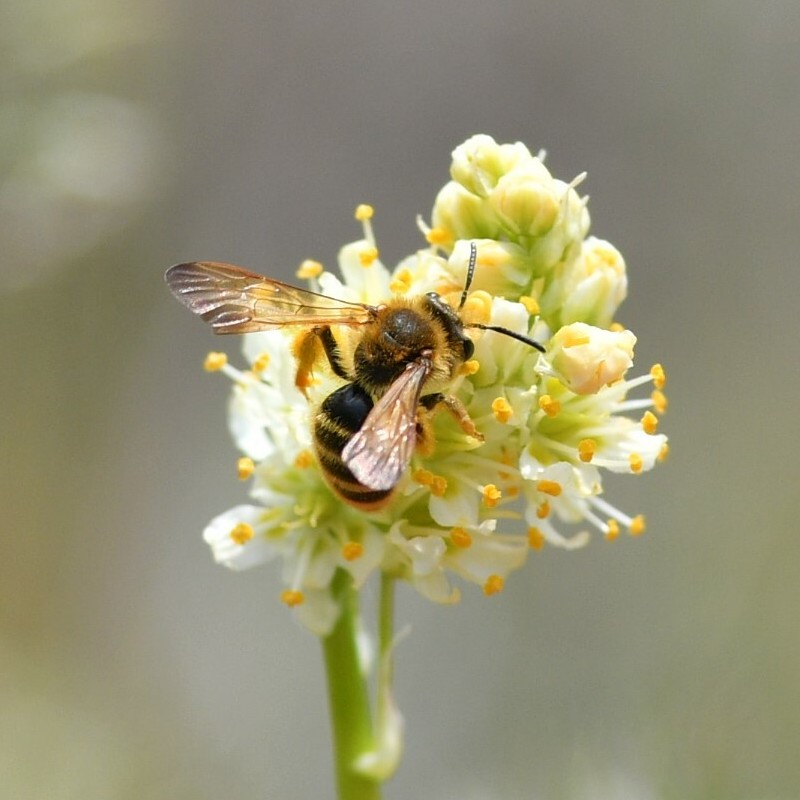
Death camas bee, Andrena astragali, foraging on a Toxicoscordion flower, British Columbia

The death camas bee forages largely or entirely at the flowers they were named for. Pollen loads being carried by females may contain as much as 80% Toxicoscordion pollen, and they may only visit other flowers for nectar before seeking pollen. In provisioning nests for their larvae females gather pollen and nectar that will contain at least 30 μg of zygacine. Species of flower known to be frequented by the bees include Toxicoscordion nuttallii, Toxicoscordion venenosum, and Toxicoscordion paniculatum. Female death camas bees are more frequently visitors to the flowers than are the males.

Experiments with the orchard mason bee (Osmia lignaria) conclusively showed that nectar and pollen from Toxicoscordion paniculatum and Toxicoscordion venenosum are poisonous to solitary bees as well as to honeybees. In general Toxicoscordion species are only rarely visited by other bee species. Scientists studying the interactions hypothesize that the evolution of tolerance for the poisons by the death camas bee is an adaptation to deter predators and/or parasites. However, further research is needed to determine if the exclusivity of rewards for the one species of bee may be a factor. Though it is the only bee that feeds upon death camas flowers, a fly species, Earomyia melnickae, was described in 2022 which so far has only been observed to feed at meadow death camas flowers as an adult.

A study of Toxicoscordion paniculatum flowers found that they are also quite dependent on pollination by death camas bees. Flowers that self pollinated failed to form a seed capsule at more than triple the rate of flowers that had been either artificially cross pollinated or been visited by bees.
