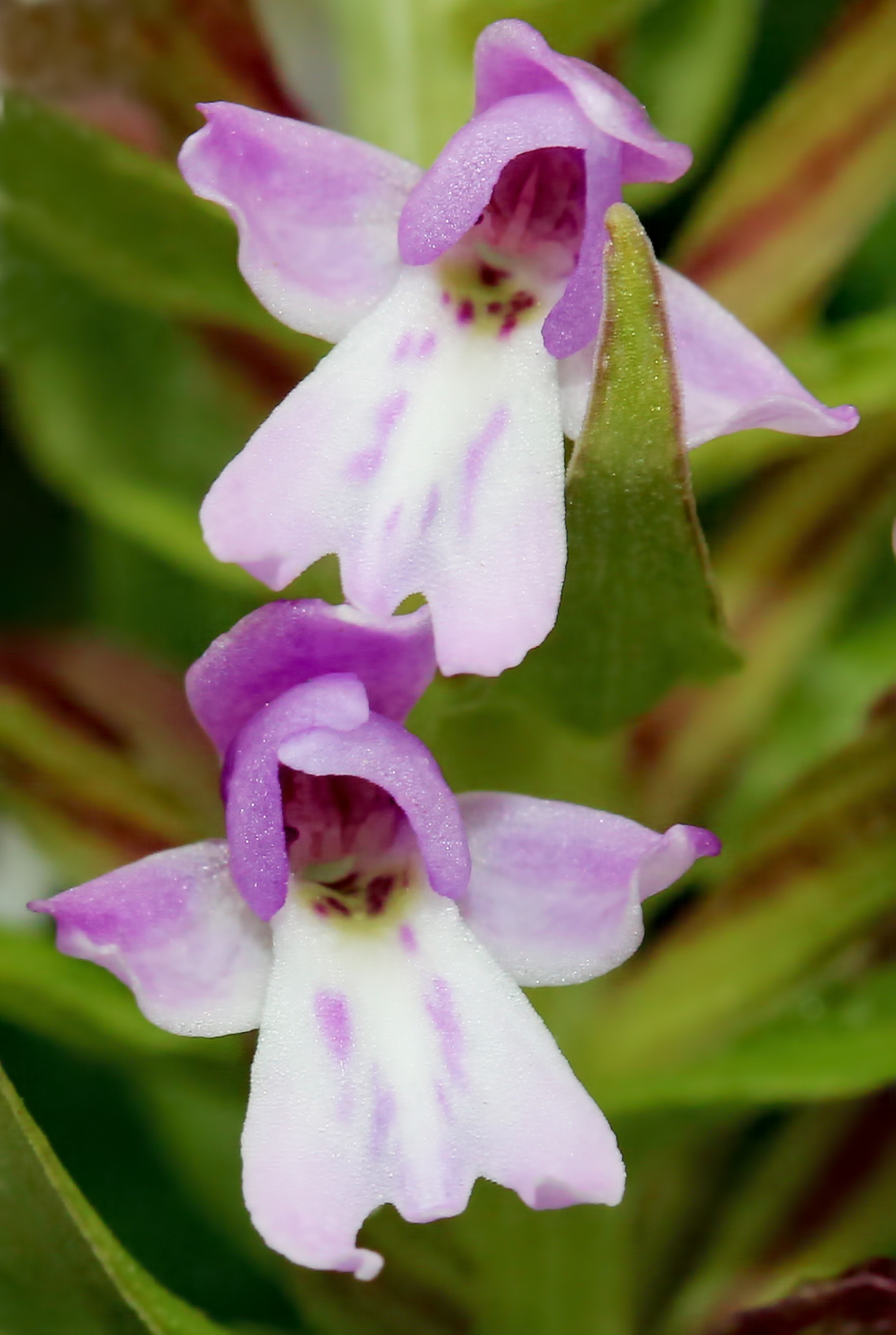

Scientific classification
- Kingdom: Plantae
- Clade: Tracheophytes
- Clade: Angiosperms
- Clade: Monocots
- Order: Asparagales
- Family: Orchidaceae
- Subfamily: Orchidoideae
- Genus: Galearis
- Species: G. camtschatica

Binomial name
- Galearis camtschatica (Cham.) X.H.Jin, Schuit. & W.T.Jin

Synonyms
- Orchis camtschatica Cham.; Gymnadenia camtschatica (Cham.) Miyabe & Kudô; Neolindleya camtschatica (Cham.) Nevski; Platanthera camtschatica (Cham.) Soó; Platanthera decipiens Lindl.; Gymnadenia vidalii Franch. & Sav.; Neolindleya decipiens (Lindl.) Kraenzl.; Gymnadenia decipiens (Lindl.) Schltr.

= Galearis camtschatica =

Species of orchid

Galearis camtschatica is a species of flowering plants in the orchid family, Orchidaceae, native to Korea, northern Japan, and the Russian Far East (Kuril Islands, Kamchatka, Sakhalin, Khabarovsk Krai).

== Taxonomy ==
The species was first described by Adelbert von Chamisso in 1828, as Orchis camtschatica. It has been placed in a variety of genera, including the monotypic genus Neolindleya. On the basis of molecular phylogenetic studies, in 2014, Neolindleya was subsumed into Galearis, with the species becoming Galearis camtschatica.
