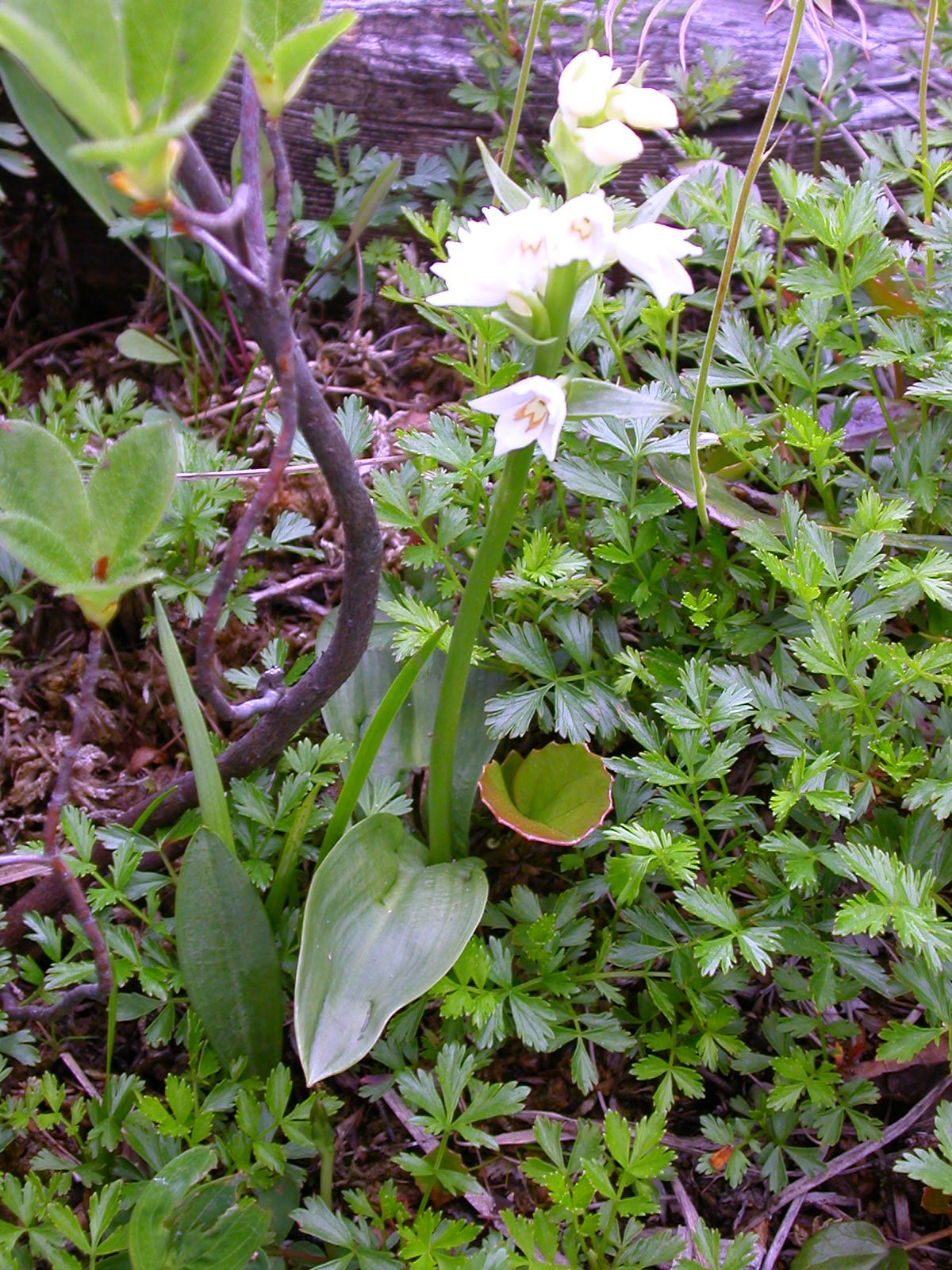

Scientific classification
- Kingdom: Plantae
- Clade: Tracheophytes
- Clade: Angiosperms
- Clade: Monocots
- Order: Asparagales
- Family: Orchidaceae
- Subfamily: Orchidoideae
- Genus: Galearis
- Species: G. fauriei

Binomial name
- Galearis fauriei Finet P.F.Hunt

Synonyms
- Orchis fauriei Finet; Chondradenia yatabei Maxim. ex Makino; Orchis chondradenia Makino; Orchis yatabei (Maxim. ex Makino) Makino; Galeorchis chondradenia (Makino) Soó; Chondradenia fauriei (Finet) Sawada ex Maek.

= Galearis fauriei =

Species of orchid

Galearis fauriei is a species of orchid endemic to Japan, specifically southern Honshu.
