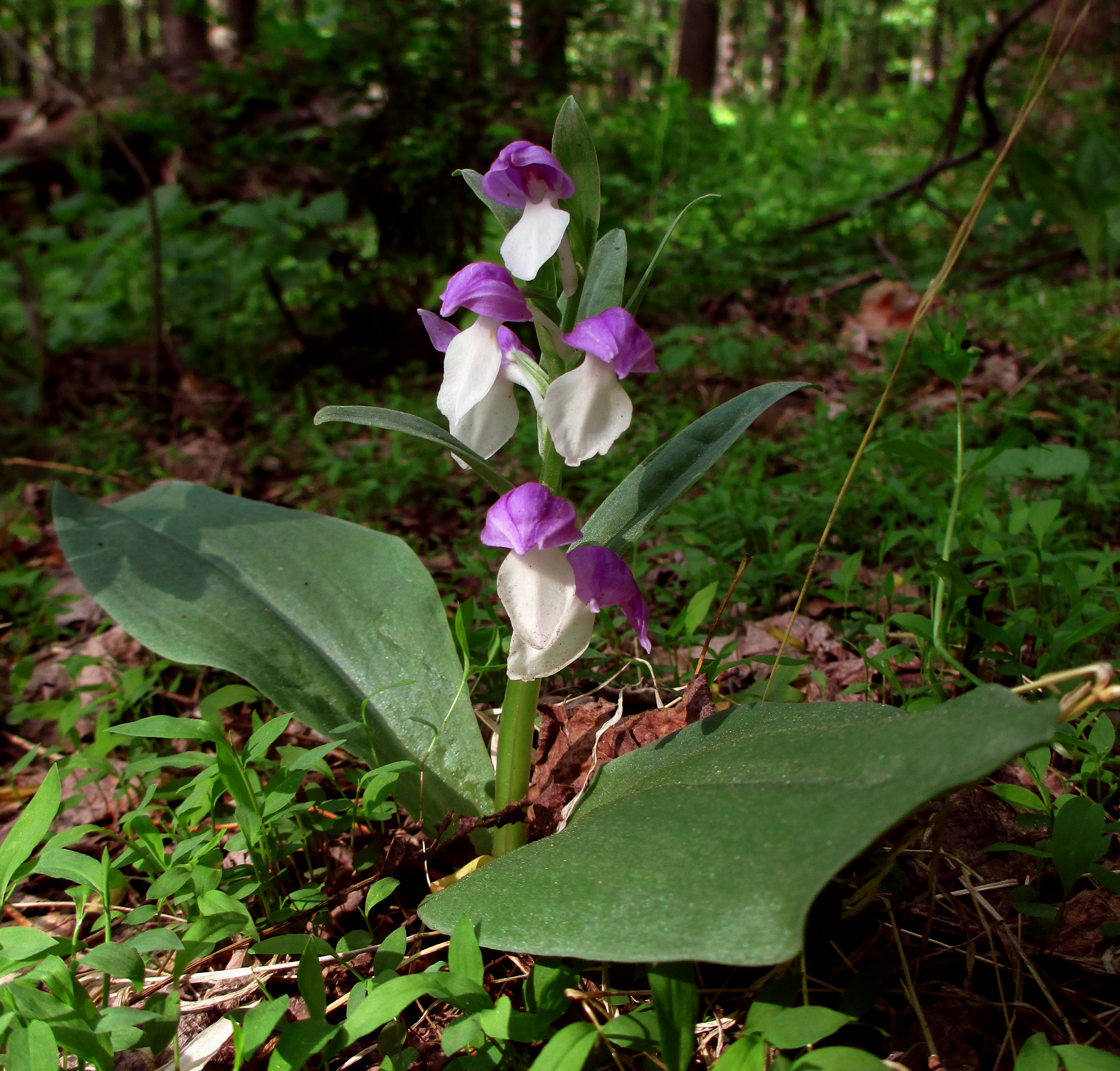

Conservation status
- Secure (NatureServe)

Scientific classification
- Kingdom: Plantae
- Clade: Tracheophytes
- Clade: Angiosperms
- Clade: Monocots
- Order: Asparagales
- Family: Orchidaceae
- Subfamily: Orchidoideae
- Genus: Galearis
- Species: G. spectabilis

Binomial name
- Galearis spectabilis (L.) Raf.

Synonyms
- Orchis spectabilis L.; Habenaria spectabilis (L.) Spreng.; Galeorchis spectabilis (L.) Rydb. in N.L.Britton; Orchis humilis Michx.; Galearis biflora Raf.; Orchis spectabilis var. lilacina Ames; Galeorchis spectabilis f. gordinieri House; Orchis spectabilis f. gordinieri Weath.; Orchis spectabilis f. albiflora Ulke; Orchis spectabilis f. willeyi F.Seym.; Galearis spectabilis f. gordinieri (House) R.E.Whiting & Catling; Galearis spectabilis f. albiflora (Ulke) C.F.Reed; Galearis spectabilis f. willeyi (F.Seym.) P.M.Br.

= Galearis spectabilis =

Species of orchid

Galearis spectabilis, commonly known as showy orchis or showy orchid, is an orchid species of the genus Galearis. It is native to eastern Canada (Quebec, Ontario and New Brunswick) and much of the eastern half of the United States. In the United States they are found from eastern Oklahoma north to eastern South Dakota in the west and from Atlanta, Georgia and North Alabama north up into Maine to the east.

== Description ==
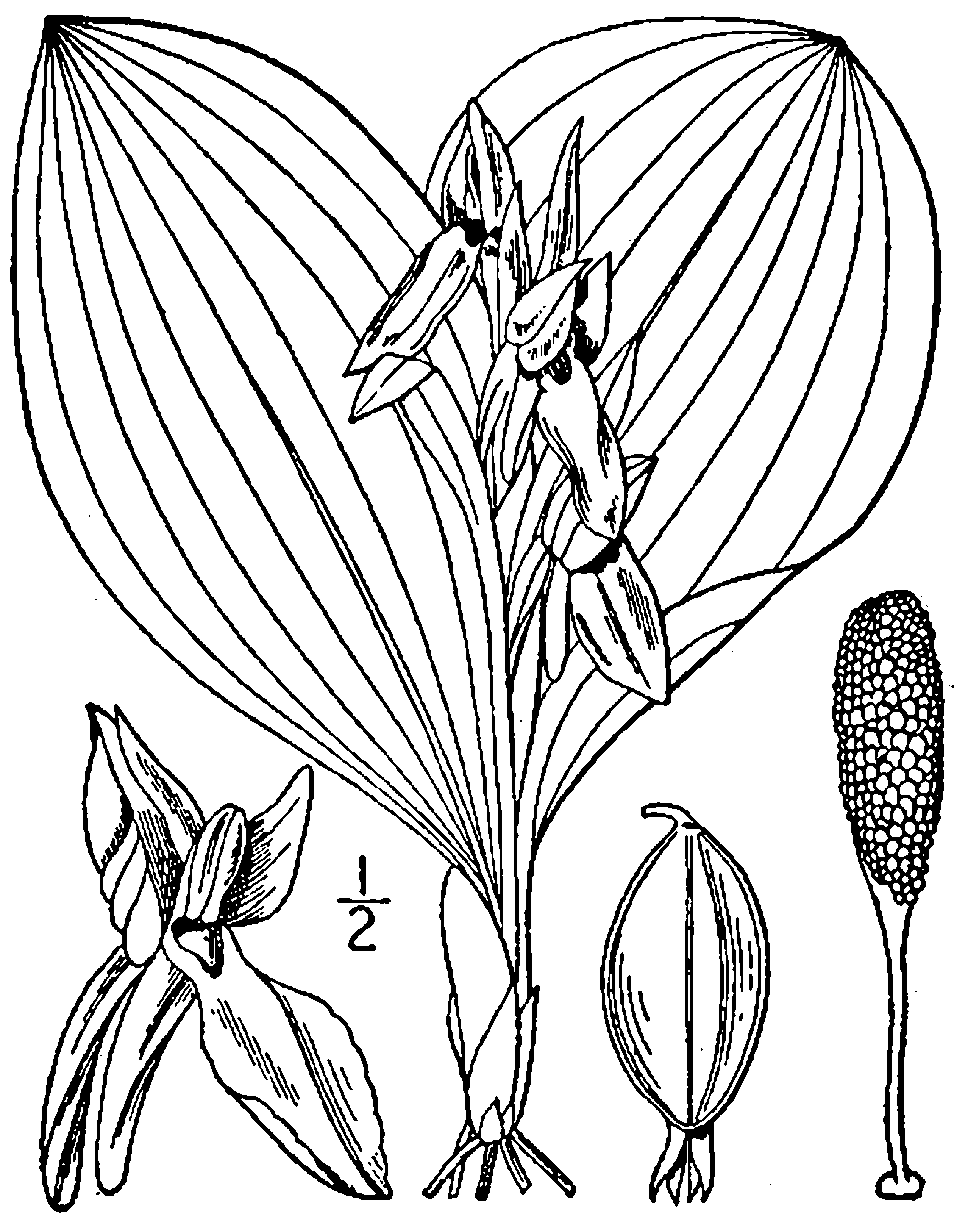
1913 folio from an illustrated Flora

Galearis spectabilis can be found in mesic deciduous woodlands in the eastern United States. G. spectabilis produces one or two oval, fleshy basal leaves from a rhizome, which persist throughout summer. Flower stalks arise on 10–15-centimeter (3.9–5.9 in) stems with three to twelve flowers blooming in April to May. The flowers are hooded and the namesake of the plant due to the showy, typically bicolored lavender and white flowers. The lavender hood is formed from three fused sepals. Two petals are tucked inside the hood and the labellum (third petal) is longer and white.

There are two color variants: G. spectabilis f. gordinierii has an all-white flower, while G. spectabilis f. willeyi has an entirely pink flower.

== Ecology ==
Galearis spectabilis can be found in mesic deciduous woodlands in the eastern United States, they begin growth in spring, producing one or two oval, fleshy basal leaves from a rhizome, which persist throughout summer. Pollination of the flower is conducted by long-tongued Bombus, as well as other bees, butterflies, and moths. Besides its alluring colors, G. spectabilis flowers also provide pollinators a nectar reward which collects at the base of the spur. G. spectabilis is typically found on hillsides which may be rocky, damp and near seeps growing under a canopy of deciduous trees in half to deep shade. Plants have also been reported to be found thriving living just about a floodplain, again under a deciduous canopy. Plants are rarely seen in full sun. Plants are slow-growing and form clumps over time via crown offshoots from the rhizome.

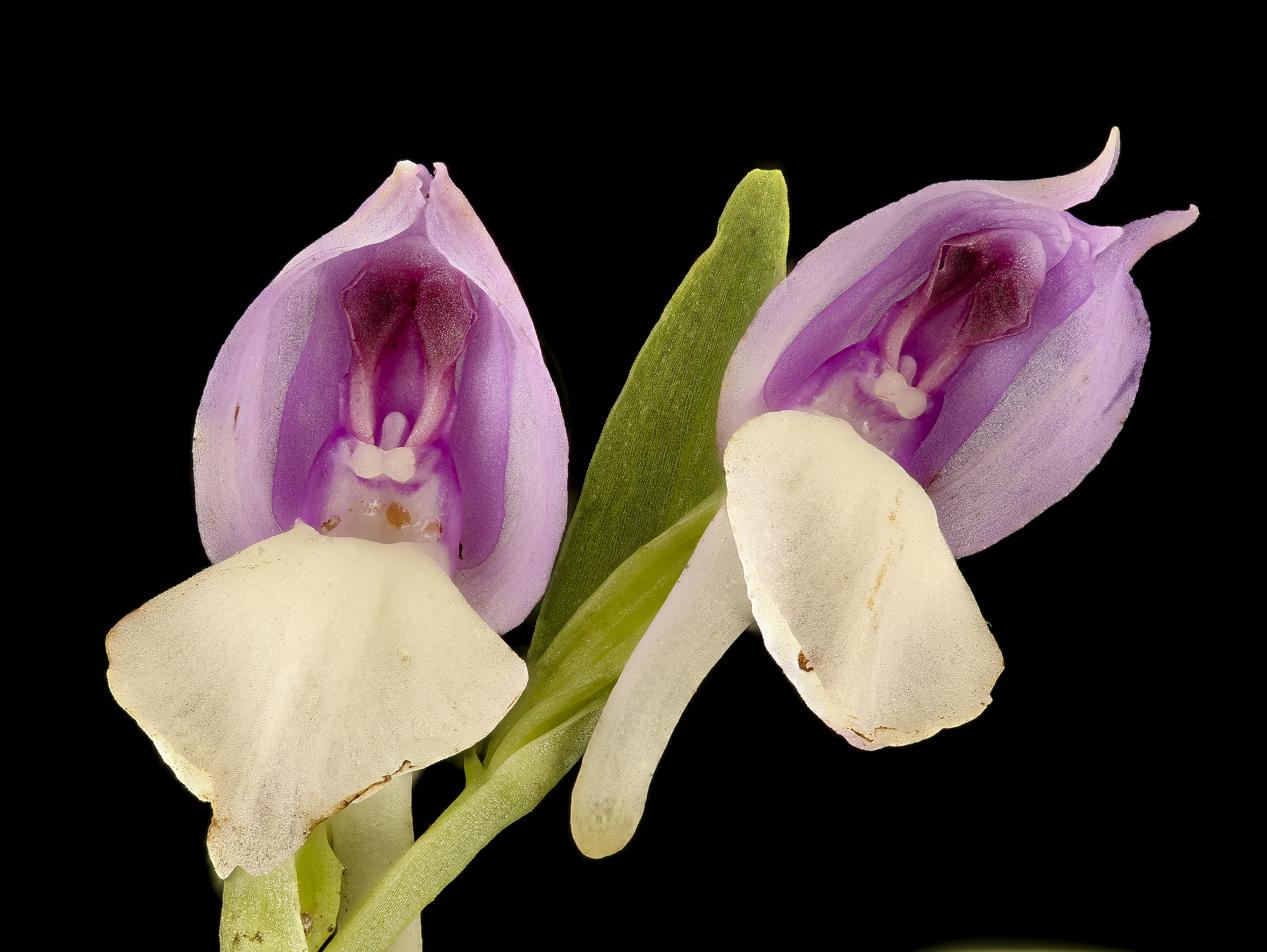
Closeup of flowers
