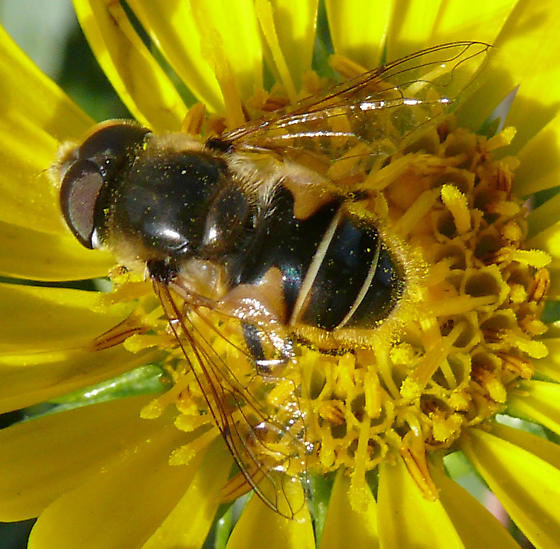

Scientific classification
- Kingdom: Animalia
- Phylum: Arthropoda
- Clade: Pancrustacea
- Class: Insecta
- Order: Diptera
- Family: Syrphidae
- Genus: Eristalis
- Species: E. hirta

Binomial name
- Eristalis hirta (Loew, 1866)

Synonyms
- Eristalis alpha Hull, 1925; Eristalis beta Hull, 1925; Eristalis hirtus Loew, 1866; Eristalis temporalis Thomson, 1869

= Eristalis hirta =

Species of fly

Eristalis hirta, the black-footed drone fly, is a common Western North American species of syrphid fly, first officially described by Loew in 1866. Hoverflies get their names from the ability to remain nearly motionless while in flight. The adults are also known as flower flies as they are commonly found on and around flowers, from which they get both energy-giving nectar and protein-rich pollen. The larvae are aquatic filter-feeders of the rat-tailed type.

== Distribution ==
This species is found in Western North America and Northern Europe in raised bogs, ditches and temporary pools.

== Description ==
For terms see Morphology of Diptera

Size
Length: 10–15 mm (0.39–0.59 in)

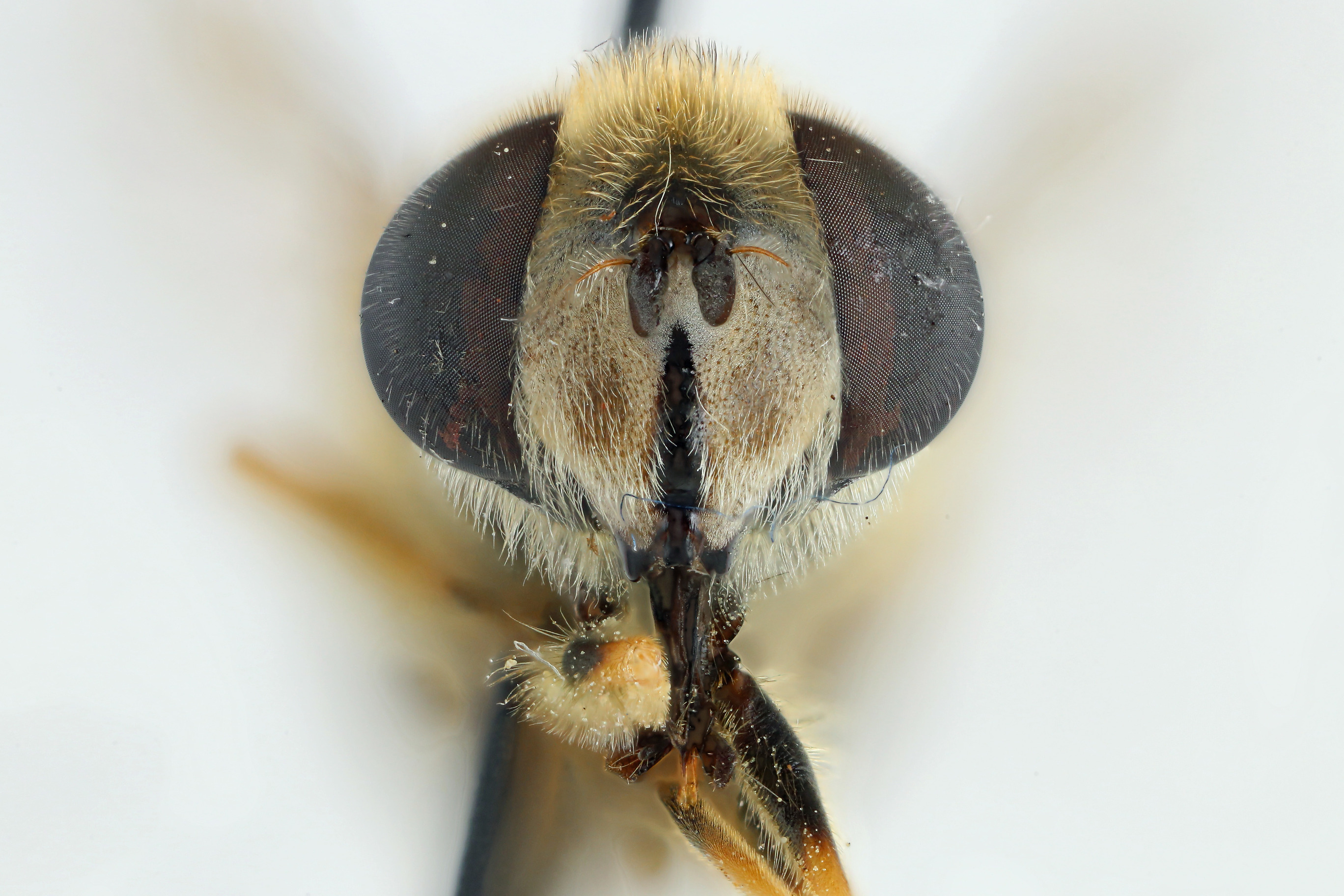
Frontal view

Head

The frons are a shiny black with light brownish yellow pile. The face and frons of female is unusually broad. The pile of the face is light brownish yellow except the facial stripe (tubercle) and the cheeks which are a shiny black. The antennae are very dark brownish black. The arista is slightly plumose basally. The eyes are contiguous only in males.

Thorax

The thorax is dark, shiny, brownish black with yellowish pile. The scutellum is lighter Brownish and shiny. The pleurae are covered with pale yellow pile.

Legs

The legs are black and yellow. The front and middle femora are black with pale yellow apices and the hind femur bases and apices are yellow. The front and hind tibia are black, with the basal half or more pale yellow and middle tibia mostly pale yellow. The tarsi are all black except the middle leg basitarsi, which are yellow.

Abdomen

The abdomen is black with yellow bands and spots. The second segment has a large, sharply marked, yellow orange spots on the sides, widely separated by opaque black medially. The light yellow posterior marginal bands of the second third and fourth segments are unusually prominent. Segments three and four are shiny black, with yellow bands posteriorly.

Wings

The wings are hyaline, or very faintly infuscated in the middle and anterior half. The pterostigma (pt) is small. Veination: spurious vein (sv), looping of R_{4+5} into r_{4+5}, closed cell r_{2+3}.

Eristalis wing

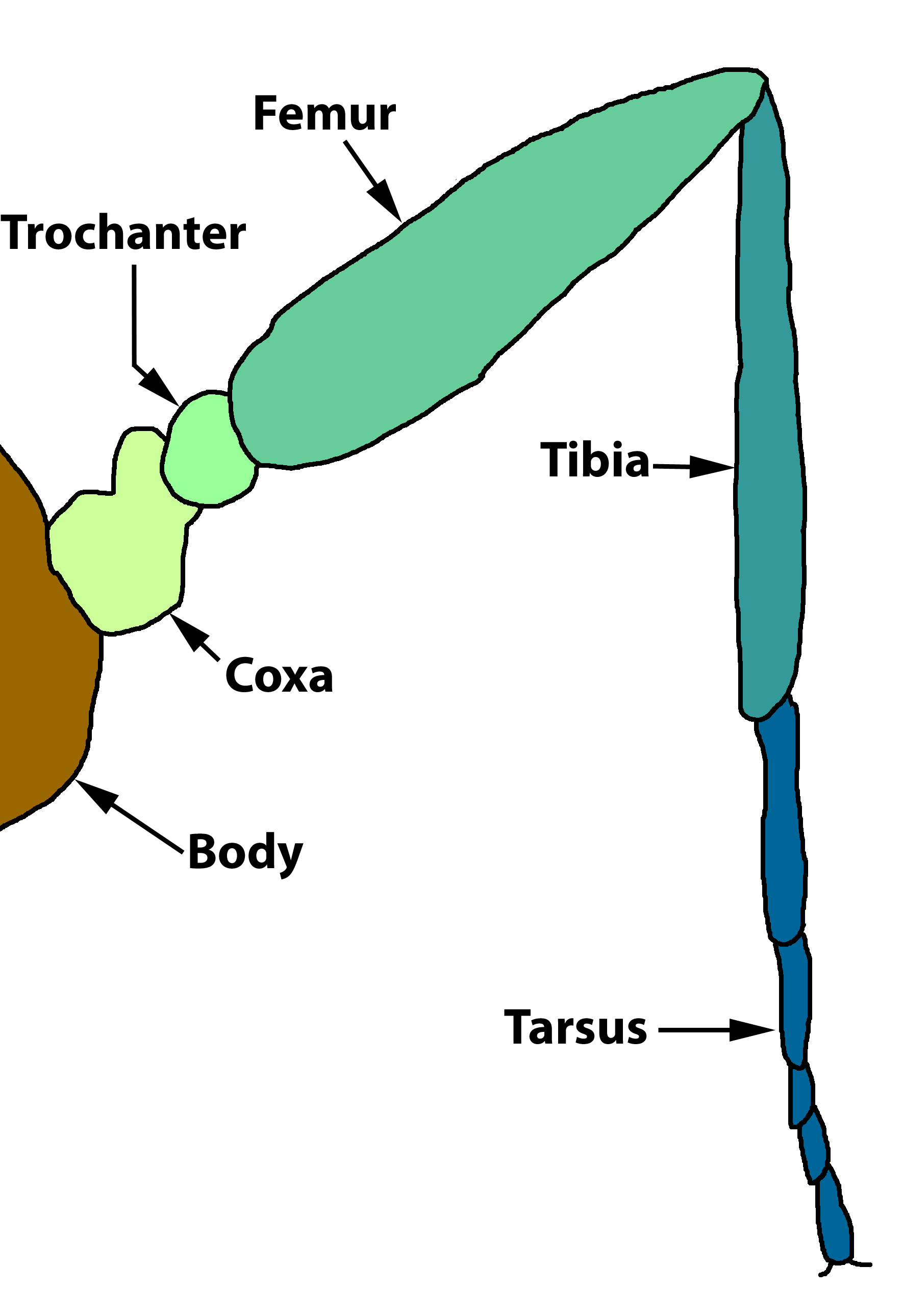
Insect leg

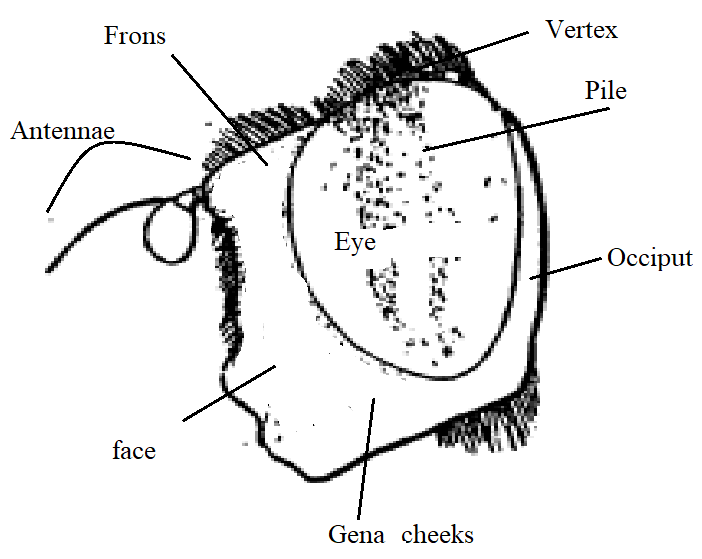
Eristalis head

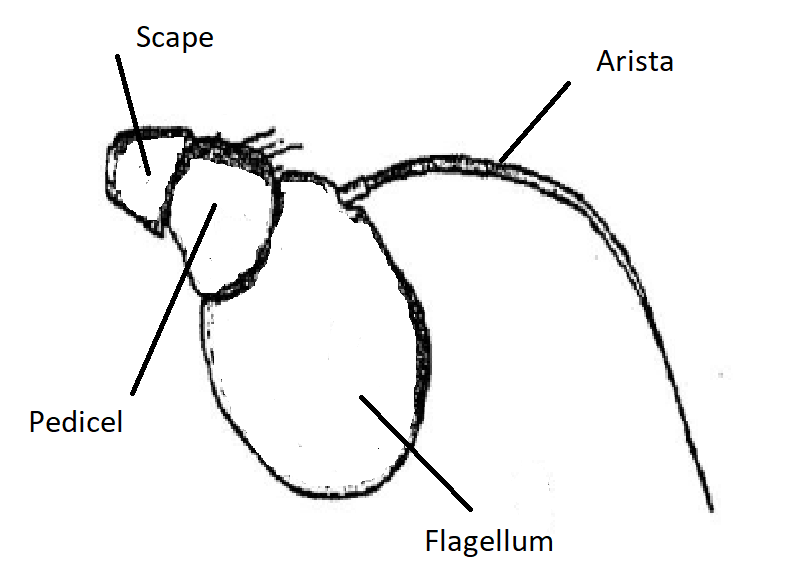
Syrphid antenna

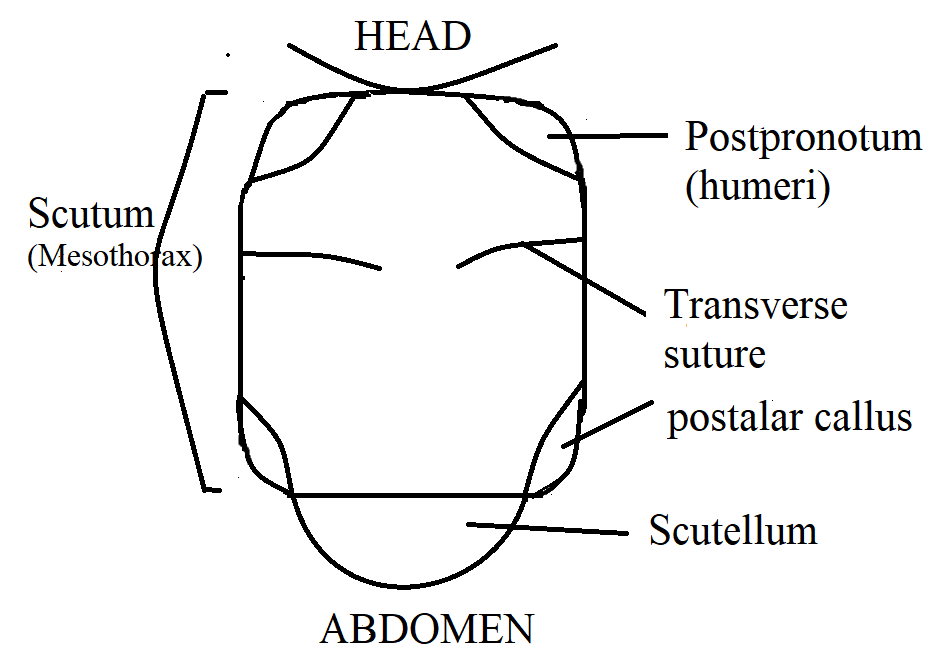
Dorsal view of Syrphid thorax
