= Bacterial blight of cassava =

Bacterial plant disease

- Causal agents: Xanthomonas axonopodis pv. manihotis
- Hosts: Cassava
- EPPO Code: XANTMN

Xanthomonas axonopodis pv. manihotis is the pathogen that causes bacterial blight of cassava. Originally discovered in Brazil in 1912, the disease has followed the cultivation of cassava across the world. Among diseases which afflict cassava worldwide, bacterial blight causes the largest losses in terms of yield.

== Hosts and symptoms ==
Xanthomonas axonopodis pv. manihotis is capable of infecting most members of the plant genus Manihot. Consisting of about 100 species, the most economically significant species is easily the widely cultivated woody shrub, Manihot esculenta, known colloquially as the cassava plant. In cassava, symptoms vary in a manner that is unique to this pathogen. Symptoms include blight, wilting, dieback, and vascular necrosis. A more diagnostic symptom visible in cassava with X. axonopodis infection is angular necrotic spotting of the leaves, often with a chlorotic ring encircling the spots. These spots begin as distinguishable moist, brown lesions normally restricted to the bottom of the plant until they enlarge and coalesce, often killing the entire leaf. A further diagnostic symptom often embodies itself as pools of gum exudate along wounds and leaf cross veins. It begins as a sappy golden liquid and hardens to form an amber deposit.

== Disease cycle ==
Xanthomonas axonopodis pv. manihotis is a vascular and foliar pathogenic species of bacteria. It normally enters its host plants through stomatal openings or hydathodes. Wounds to stems have also been noted as a means of entry. Once inside its host, X. axonopodis enzymatically dissolves barriers to the plant's vascular system and so begins a systemic infection. Because of its enzymes inability to break down highly lignified cell walls, this pathogen prefers to feed on younger tissues and often follows xylem vessels into developing buds and seeds. Seeds which have been invaded by a high number of bacteria are sometimes deformed and necrotic, but assays have shown a high percentage of infected seeds are asymptomatic carriers. In moist conditions, Xanthomonas axonopodis pv. manihotis has been shown to survive asymptomatically for up to thirty months without new host tissue, but is a poor survivor in soil. It persists from one growing season to the next in infected seeds and infected clippings planted as clones in fields. Once one cassava plant is infected, the whole crop is put at risk of infection by rainsplash, contaminated cultivation tools, and foot traffic. These are effective methods of transmission because they cause wounds to healthy cassava plants, and X. axonopodis uses these wounds as an entry point.

== Environment ==
Hailing from Brazil, Xanthomonas axonopodis pv. manihotis excels in a humid subtropical to tropical climate. Plantations of Manihot esculenta often take place in soils characterized for being arid, lacking in nutrients, and prone to erosion especially when the cultivation occurs in sloped fields. This crop is commonly found in the tropical and subtropical regions of Africa, Asia and Latin America, and X. axonopodis has followed it. It has been confirmed up and down Latin America into North America, Sub-Saharan Africa, Southeast Asia/India, and even Polynesia. These regions are prone to high precipitation rates, a climate variable that propagates Xam epidemics. Constant rain events and windsplashes are the main form transmission of the secondary inoculum of the disease. Nevertheless, the high humidity and high air temperatures (77–90 °F) of tropical and subtropical regions make Cbb a conducive epidemic. The favorable conditions described allow colonial growth and eventual swarm behavior to enter hydathodes, stomata, or wounds.

== Pathogenesis ==
Similar to other phytobacteria, Xam requires the assembly of a type 3 secretion system (T3SS) to initiate infection. After cell recognition by the T3SS, Xam releases type III effector proteins to modulate the cell's innate immunity. These effectors are denominated as transcription activator-like (TAL) effectors. While varying among strains, TAL effectors maintain several domains conserved. These include an N-terminal type III secretion signal, a central domain, a transcription acidic activation domain (AAD), and a C-terminal nuclear localization signal (NLS). N-terminal type III secretion signal allows the entry of the effector through the T3SS into the cell, and the NLS mobilizes the effector into the cell nucleus. The latter acts by emitting signals and recruiting host proteins for translocation. After gaining nuclear entry, sequence-specific protein-DNA interactions are carried by the central region, which recognizes a specific DNA sequence to which it attaches. The specificity is acquired by a two-residues combination (12 and 13 mer) in every tandem repeat that composes the central region; a change in a residue will result in a change of specificity towards a promoter. Finally, AAD is known as the cause of final transcription modulation, essential for virulence or avirulence. It has been recorded that Xam works with the activation of SWEET sugar transporters, promoting the efflux of glucose and sucrose to the apoplasm for bacterial benefit.

== Management ==
=== Cultural approaches ===
Several disease management techniques have been developed to control Cbb incidence and dissemination. Cultural practices have been used to decrease the incidence of the pathogen or delay the effect of the disease in the field. Pruning or total extirpation of infected plant tissue, weed removal, use of certified seeds, bacterial analysis of stem cuttings and crop rotation are used the most to limit the disease presence in the field. Transplantation of clones is the most common mode of propagation of this crop so the most important control of bacterial wilt of cassava is planting uninfected clones. In areas where bacterial wilt has not yet been established, it is important to raise a new crop from a meristem culture certifiably free of disease. In areas where the disease is already prevalent, great care should be taken to ensure clippings are taken from healthy plants and even then from the highly lignified portion at the base of cassava plants which appear healthy.

Seeds are known to be able harbor the pathogen, but successful sanitation measures have been described. Infected seed immersed in water at 60 °C showed no sign of bacterial survival while the seed showed no reduction in germination potential. Furthermore, the sanitation of tools and big machinery are crucial to avoid the infection of healthy plants through mechanical inoculation.

Intercropping and crop rotation have both been implemented in cassava cultivation and have been successful. In the instance of crop rotation following an infected cassava crop, deep soil turnover is recommended and a period of six months should be observed before cassava is planted again; X. axonopodis is a poor soil survivor and does not sporulate, so this time frame should clear crop fields of inoculum. It is also important to clear the field of weeds as X. axonopodis is known to survive much longer epiphytically on weeds than it does in soil.

=== Biological control ===
Colombian clones of cassava normally susceptible to bacterial blight showed a yield increase by a factor of 2.7 when applications of Pseudomonas fluorescens and P. putida were applied four times a month during the growing season. This approach shows promise but requires further investigation.

=== Host resistance ===
The last commonly used method is the mixed cultures using resistant cultivars, keeping in mind that yield can be affected with certain cultivars. There is considerable variance in cassava resistance to bacterial wilt, and this is a promising means of control. The resistance which has been identified in South American strains of cassava works by preventing colonization of the xylem. The genes which control this resistance are currently being mapped and implementation efficiency should see uptick in coming years.

== Importance ==
Cassava is a staple of the human diets in developing countries in the tropics. Global production in 2007 was 228 million tons, with 52% coming from Africa. It is estimated that cassava accounts for 37% of total calories consumed by humans in Africa. It has been further estimated that it provides the sixth most calories of any crop worldwide. These numbers would probably be even more impressive if bacterial blight were eradicated. Estimates for how much cassava crop Xanathomas axonopodis pv. manihotis destroys every year vary widely, but one infected transplant can end in 30% loss of yield in one growing cycle and up to 80% by the third cycle if no control measures are taken. There have been a number of historical outbreaks of bacterial blight. Zaire lost 75% of its tuber yield and almost all of its protein-rich leaf yield every year of the early 1970s, while parts of Brazil lost 50% of tuber yield in 1974.
