= Yellow cassava =

Variety of root vegetable

Yellow cassava is a new, yellow-fleshed breed of one of the most popular root crops in the tropics. Regular cassava is a staple crop in tropical countries which 300 million people rely upon for at least 10% of their daily caloric intake, in 15 African countries "In the Democratic Republic of the Congo, cassava is estimated to provide more than 1000 kcal/day to over 40 million people". Three yellow root cassava varieties, UMUCASS 36, UMUCASS 37, and UMUCASS 38, are being grown (under the Harvest Plus Project) in Nigeria for their high concentrations of β-carotene. β-carotene is a precursor to Vitamin A. Vitamin A deficiency is a major issue, especially in Africa. Nigeria in particular sees a prevalence of Vitamin A deficiency in nearly one third of children under five years old. Since cassava is a major food staple, yellow cassava shows great potential to alleviate Vitamin A deficiency in Africa.

== Description ==
Yellow cassava is similar to ordinary varieties of cassava (Manihot esculenta, see cassava) but it has a yellow flesh inside the root, which is generally white in ordinary varieties. Cassava is a woody shrub that grows large roots, which are harvested for consumption. The roots consist of three parts: the central pith, the peel, and a vascular bundle within the central pith. The new yellow varieties have high yields and are resistant to many pests and diseases. Like ordinary cassava, it does not need nutrient rich soils or extensive land preparation and does not suffer during droughts.

== History ==
Cassava originated from South America. The three varieties of yellow cassava, UMUCASS 36, UMUCASS 37, and UMUCASS 38, are the results of a 12-year contest in Nigeria funded by HarvestPlus, through the International Institute of Tropical Agriculture (IITA) and Nigeria's National Root Crop Research Institute. Breeding is ongoing and new innovations hope to achieve a β-carotene level of 15 micrograms/gram by 2015.

== Growing conditions ==
The new yellow varieties have high yields and are resistant to many pests and diseases. Like ordinary cassava, they do not need nutrient rich soils or extensive land preparation and do not suffer significantly as many other crops during droughts.

== Post-harvest processing ==
Cassava is usually stored in the ground until needed, as it is highly perishable after harvest. Drying of the tuber is one simple method of cassava preservation; however some methods of drying are more effective than others in terms of retaining β-carotene levels. Oven drying at 60°C was shown to maintain 72% of the β-carotene levels though the retention fell to 40% after four weeks in storage. Sun drying only resulted in a 38% retention of β-carotene levels, and after four weeks in storage, the levels fell to about 18%. β-carotene retention can be improved by pretreatments such as blanching and osmotic dehydration. Peeling of cassava roots is very labour-intensive. Breeding efforts have been executed to select for a white peel in order to reduce the labour associated with peel removal. One cultivar, Branca de Santa Catarina, has been selected for this reason. Though cassava is easily perishable once harvested, it is beneficial to rural farmers because it can act as an insurance crop during droughts or other crop failures. However, carotenoid accumulation in cassava has been found to be accompanied by marked reductions in post-harvest physiological deterioration (PPD) of storage roots. This is worth looking into to maximize the potential of this staple crop for both nutritional and industrial use.

== Genetic stocks/breeding ==
Three genetic types are being grown in Nigeria, UMUCASS 36, UMUCASS 37, and UMUCASS 38. Cassava can reproduce sexually or by propagation. Yellow cassava cannot be purchased from any producers currently, but a distribution system is being implemented in Nigeria providing 25,000 local households with stems under the condition that they will share their stems with other rural farmers the next season. This is the main approach to widen the distribution of yellow cassava.

== Complaints about yellow cassava (controversies) ==
In 2011, environmental rights action group Friends of the Earth Nigeria (FoEN) unsuccessfully demanded a halt to any research on genetically modified cassava in Nigeria by the International Institute of Tropical Agriculture (IITA) research team, arguing that IITA is undermining biodiversity.

"We can get vitamin A from carrots,' Mariann Bassey, coordinator of Environmental Rights Action/Friends of the Earth Nigeria (FoEN), told journalists. 'We do not need this so-called "biofortified" cassava. Why will you (IITA) not leave this classic Southern crop alone?" Bassey said biofortified cassava research was a replay of what she termed the "Golden Rice hoax". According to Bassey, golden rice, developed in 1999 to treat vitamin A deficiency, had fundamental problems. She said an adult would need to eat around nine kilograms of cooked rice a day for the required intake of vitamin A, whereas eating just two carrots would suffice.

Carrots, however, are not frequently consumed or available in much of Nigeria. Researchers have examined consumer willingness to purchase and eat yellow cassava in Nigeria and found that, in the absence of nutritional information, light yellow varieties are prized over white ones in the southwest (Oyo State) but not the southeast (Imo State). With an information campaign, yellow varieties capture larger premiums over white in all regions.

== Consumption and uses ==
The edible portion of the cassava root is the central pith. It is an excellent source of carbohydrates. The peel surrounding the root is inedible, although it can be used as feed for pigs and goats. Some farmers will harvest and eat the leaves as a vegetable. These "leaves are a major component of the diet" in The "Democratic Republic of the Congo, Tanzania, Sierra Leone, Liberia and Guinea".

== Nutritional information ==
Vitamin A deficiency is common in sub-Saharan Africa. In Nigeria, it affects about 20% of pregnant women and 30% of children under five. It can impair immune systems and vision which could cause blindness and, in some cases, death. Yellow cassava contains high levels of β-carotene, which is a precursor to vitamin A. Cassava is also a major source of carbohydrates, 80% of which are starches. The new, yellow cassava can provide up to 25% of daily recommended Vitamin A intake. Since cassava is a major part of many people's diets, introducing cassava bio-fortified with Vitamin A is an excellent innovation to improve health on a large scale.

== Social/cultural benefits/issues ==
It is normally risky to change the colour of a staple crop because colour preference can negatively affect consumer adoption rates. This is not the case with yellow cassava. Since local consumers often add palm oil to white cassava flour in their foods, they are normally accustomed to the golden colour. Therefore, the yellow colour has been shown not to deter consumers.

== Constraints to wider adoption ==
Cassava is primarily grown and eaten in rural areas. Its perishability is a constraint to breeding and innovation because when the crop starts to rot within days, it cannot be analyzed in a lab for any long periods of time. Since it is highly perishable, it is not a good export crop and its distribution requires a localized approach.

== Practical information ==
Since cassava can be reproduced through propagation, cutting off part of the stem and sharing it with other farmers is a good way to provide Vitamin A-rich yellow cassava to rural populations. When preserving cassava, pretreating prior to drying can have a positive effect of the level of β-carotene retention during storage. Since cassava does not have a critical time of harvest, it is recommended to grow a lot of cassava and harvest it the day of consumption. This makes cassava a good insurance crop for times when food is scarce.
