= Fenamiphos =

Names
- Preferred IUPAC name (RS)-N-[Ethoxy-(3-methyl-4-methylsulfanylphenoxy)phosphoryl]propan-2-amine
- Systematic IUPAC name (RS)-{Ethoxy[3-methyl-4-(methylsulfanyl)phenoxy]phosphoryl}(propan-2-yl)amine

Identifiers
CAS Number	22224-92-6
3D model (JSmol)	Interactive image
Beilstein Reference	4752893
ChEBI	CHEBI:38680
ChEMBL	ChEMBL450410
ChemSpider	28827 (R/S)
ECHA InfoCard	100.040.756
EC Number	244-848-1
KEGG	C18659
MeSH	Fenamiphos
PubChem CID	31070 (R/S); 38988461 (R); 38988460 (S)
RTECS number	TB3675000
UNII	H4NO3L2HBE
UN number	2783, 2811
CompTox Dashboard (EPA)	DTXSID3024102
- InChI: InChI=1S/C13H22NO3PS/c1-6-16-18(15,14-10(2)3)17-12-7-8-13(19-5)11(4)9-12/h7-10H,6H2,1-5H3,(H,14,15) Key: ZCJPOPBZHLUFHF-UHFFFAOYSA-N; InChI=1/C13H22NO3PS/c1-6-16-18(15,14-10(2)3)17-12-7-8-13(19-5)11(4)9-12/h7-10H,6H2,1-5H3,(H,14,15) Key: ZCJPOPBZHLUFHF-UHFFFAOYAA
- SMILES: O=P(OCC)(Oc1ccc(SC)c(c1)C)NC(C)C

Properties
Chemical formula	C_{13}H_{22}NO_{3}PS
Molar mass	303.36 g·mol^{−1}
Appearance	Off-white to tan waxy solid
Density	1.14 g/cm^{3}
Melting point	49 °C; 121 °F; 323 K
Solubility in water	0.03% (20 °C)
Vapor pressure	0.00005 mmHg (20 °C)

Hazards
- Occupational safety and health (OHS/OSH)
Main hazards	Toxic
- NIOSH (US health exposure limits)
PEL (Permissible)	none
REL (Recommended)	TWA 0.1 mg/m^{3} [skin]
IDLH (Immediate danger)	N.D.
- Except where otherwise noted, data are given for materials in their standard state (at 25 °C [77 °F], 100 kPa). verify (what is ?) Infobox references

Fenamiphos is an organophosphate cholinesterase inhibitor used as an insecticide.
