= Typhlodromalus =

Scientific classification
- Kingdom: Animalia
- Phylum: Arthropoda
- Subphylum: Chelicerata
- Class: Arachnida
- Order: Mesostigmata
- Family: Phytoseiidae
- Subfamily: Amblyseiinae
- Genus: Typhlodromalus; Muma, 1961

Genus of mites

Typhlodromalus is a genus of mites in the Phytoseiidae family.

== Species ==
- Typhlodromalus aequidens (Blommers, 1974)
- Typhlodromalus arawak De Leon, 1966
- Typhlodromalus aripo De Leon, 1967
- Typhlodromalus athiasae (Pritchard & Baker, 1962)
- Typhlodromalus breviscutus Moraes, Oliveira & Zannou, 2001
- Typhlodromalus chikmagalurensis (Gupta, 1986)
- Typhlodromalus chitradurgae (Gupta, 1986)
- Typhlodromalus clavicus Denmark & Muma, 1973
- Typhlodromalus congeae (De Leon, 1965)
- Typhlodromalus distinctus (Denmark & Matthysse, 1981)
- Typhlodromalus endiandrae (Schicha, 1993)
- Typhlodromalus eucalypticus Gupta, 1978
- Typhlodromalus eujeniae (Gupta, 1977)
- Typhlodromalus ezoensis (Ehara, 1967)
- Typhlodromalus feresi Lofego, Moraes & McMurtry, 2000
- Typhlodromalus fragosoi (Yoshida-Shaul & Chant, 1991)
- Typhlodromalus guajavae (Gupta, 1978)
- Typhlodromalus havu (Pritchard & Baker, 1962)
- Typhlodromalus higuilloae Denmark & Muma, 1975
- Typhlodromalus hova (Blommers, 1976)
- Typhlodromalus huapingensis (Wu & Li, 1985)
- Typhlodromalus hum (Pritchard & Baker, 1962)
- Typhlodromalus jarooa (Gupta, 1977)
- Typhlodromalus jucundus (Chant, 1959)
- Typhlodromalus julus Denmark & Evans, in Denmark, Evans, Aguilar, Vargas & Ochoa 1999
- Typhlodromalus laaensis (Gupta, 1986)
- Typhlodromalus laetus (Chant & Baker, 1965)
- Typhlodromalus lailae (Schicha, 1979)
- Typhlodromalus limonicus (Garman & McGregor, 1956)
- Typhlodromalus lunatus Denmark & Evans, in Denmark, Evans, Aguilar, Vargas & Ochoa 1999
- Typhlodromalus macrosetosus (van der Merwe, 1965)
- Typhlodromalus manihoti (Moraes, 1994)
- Typhlodromalus manipurensis (Gupta, 1978)
- Typhlodromalus marmoreus (El-Banhawy, 1978)
- Typhlodromalus munsteriensis (van der Merwe, 1965)
- Typhlodromalus ntandu (Pritchard & Baker, 1962)
- Typhlodromalus olombo (Pritchard & Baker, 1962)
- Typhlodromalus peregrinus (Muma, 1955)
- Typhlodromalus planetarius (De Leon, 1959)
- Typhlodromalus propitius (Chant & Baker, 1965)
- Typhlodromalus rhusi (van der Merwe, 1965)
- Typhlodromalus rosayroi Denmark & Muma, 1978
- Typhlodromalus rosica (Gupta, 1992)
- Typhlodromalus saltus (Denmark & Matthysse, 1981)
- Typhlodromalus serengati (El-Banhawy & Abou-Awad, 1990)
- Typhlodromalus sexta (Garman, 1958)
- Typhlodromalus simus Denmark & Muma, 1973
- Typhlodromalus sorghumae (Gupta, 1977)
- Typhlodromalus spinosus (Meyer & Rodrigues, 1966)
- Typhlodromalus swaga (Pritchard & Baker, 1962)
- Typhlodromalus tasaformis (Schicha & Corpuz-Raros, 1992)
- Typhlodromalus tenuiscutus McMurtry & Moraes, 1989
- Typhlodromalus terminatus (Chant & Baker, 1965)
- Typhlodromalus tigrus Denmark & Evans, in Denmark, Evans, Aguilar, Vargas & Ochoa 1999
- Typhlodromalus ultimus (Chant & Baker, 1965)
- Typhlodromalus villacarmelensis (Moraes), 1994)
- Typhlodromalus yunquensis (De Leon, 1965)
