= List of poisonous plants =

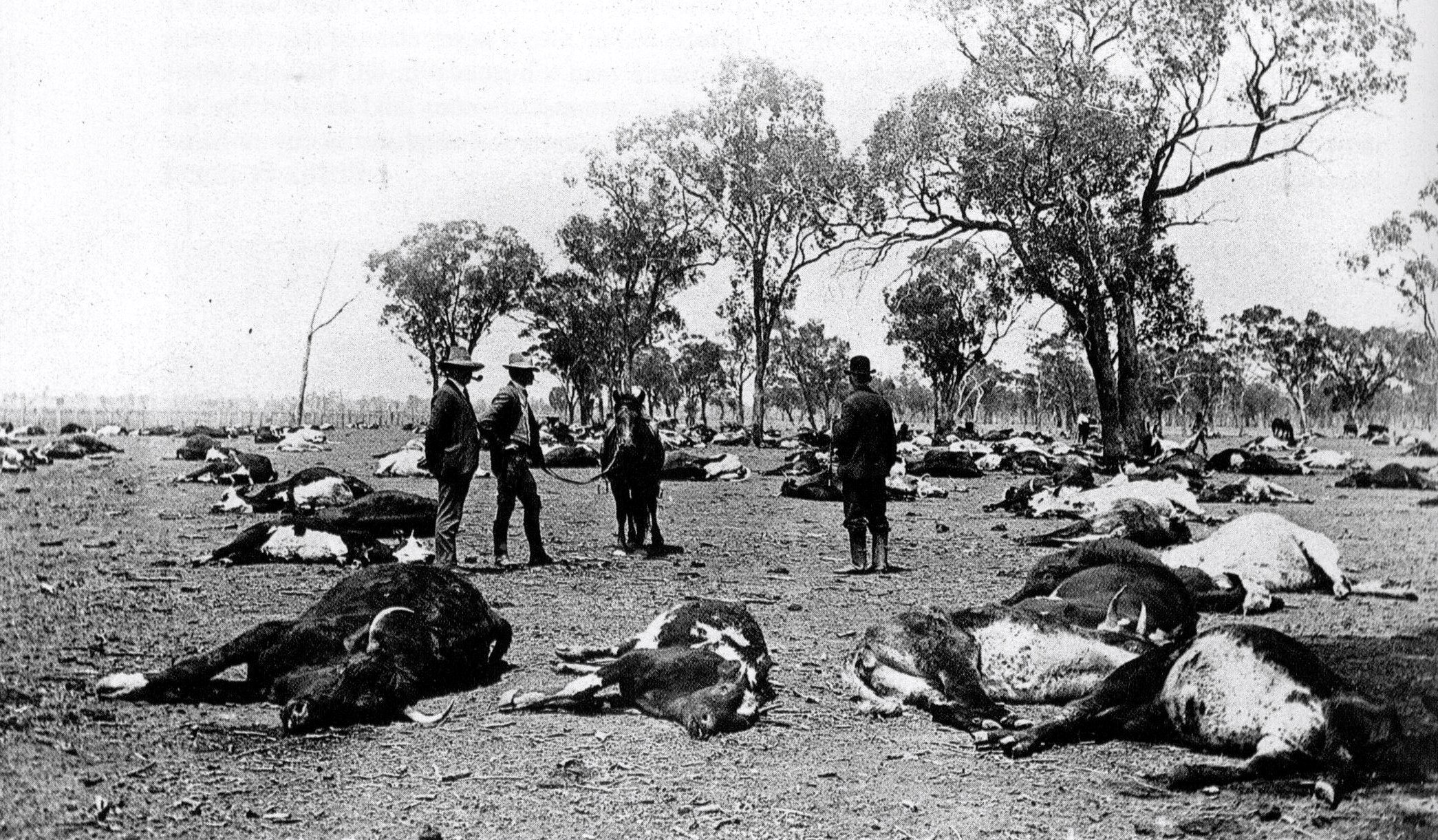
Australia, 1907: Cattlemen survey 700 cattle that were killed overnight by poisonous plants

Plants that cause illness or death after consuming them are referred to as poisonous plants. The toxins in poisonous plants affect herbivores, and deter them from consuming the plants. Plants cannot move to escape their predators, so they must have other means of protecting themselves from herbivorous animals. Some plants have physical defenses such as thorns, spines and prickles, but by far the most common type of protection is chemical.

Over millennia, through the process of natural selection, plants have evolved the means to produce a vast and complicated array of chemical compounds to deter herbivores. Tannin, for example, is a defensive compound that emerged relatively early in the evolutionary history of plants, while more complex molecules such as polyacetylenes are found in younger groups of plants such as the Asterales. Many of the known plant defense compounds primarily defend against consumption by insects, though other animals, including humans, that consume such plants may also experience negative effects, ranging from mild discomfort to death.

Many of these poisonous compounds also have important medicinal benefits. The varieties of phytochemical defenses in plants are so numerous that many questions about them remain unanswered, including:

1. Which plants have which types of defense?
2. Which herbivores, specifically, are the plants defended against?
3. What chemical structures and mechanisms of toxicity are involved in the compounds that provide defense?
4. What are the potential medical uses of these compounds?

These questions and others constitute an active area of research in modern botany, with important implications for understanding plant evolution and medical science.

Below is an extensive, if incomplete, list of plants containing one or more poisonous parts that pose a serious risk of illness, injury, or death to humans or domestic animals. There is significant overlap between plants considered poisonous and those with psychotropic properties, some of which are toxic enough to present serious health risks at recreational doses. There is a distinction between plants that are poisonous because they naturally produce dangerous phytochemicals, and those that may become dangerous for other reasons, including but not limited to infection by bacterial, viral, or fungal parasites; the uptake of toxic compounds through contaminated soil or groundwater; and/or the ordinary processes of decay after the plant has died; this list deals exclusively with plants that produce phytochemicals. Many plants, such as peanuts, produce compounds that are only dangerous to people who have developed an allergic reaction to them, and with a few exceptions, those plants are not included here (see list of allergens instead). Despite the wide variety of plants considered poisonous, human fatalities caused by poisonous plants – especially resulting from accidental ingestion – are rare in the developed world.

== Poisonous plants used as food ==
Many plants commonly used as food possess toxic parts, are toxic unless processed, or are toxic at certain stages of their lives. Some only pose a serious threat to certain animals (such as cats, dogs, or livestock) or certain types of people (such as infants, the elderly, or the immunocompromised). Most of these food plants are safe for the average adult to eat in modest quantities. Notable examples include:

Scientific name	Common name(s)	Family	Description	Picture
Aleurites moluccanus	candlenut, Indian walnut, or kukui	Euphorbiaceae	The seeds contain saponin, phorbol, and toxalbumins, they are mildly toxic when raw, inducing a laxative effect. Heat treatment reduces the toxicity of the protein component.	
Allium spp.	onion, garlic, leek, and chive	Amaryllidaceae	Many members of the genus Allium contain thiosulphate, which in high doses is toxic to dogs, cats, and some types of livestock. Cats are more sensitive.	
Asparagus spp.	asparagus	Asparagaceae	Several species including Asparagus officinalis and Asparagus densiflorus. Though asparagus plants cultivated for food are typically harvested before they reach reproductive maturity, the berries of the mature plant are poisonous, containing furostanol and spirostanol saponins. Rapid ingestion of more than five to seven ripe berries can induce abdominal pain and vomiting. Sulfur compounds in the young shoots are also considered at least partially responsible for mild skin reactions in some people who handle the plant.	
Blighia sapida	ackee	Sapindaceae	The seeds, unripened arils, and inedible portions of the ackee fruit contain the toxins hypoglycin A and hypoglycin B, which inhibit enzymes involved in fatty acid metabolism and thereby cause a depletion of stored glucose, which is necessary to meet the body's energy needs, and in turn leads to hypoglycemia.	
Citrus spp.	lemon, lime, grapefruit, orange, etc.	Rutaceae	Most citrus fruits, including lemon (Citrus limon), lime, and orange (Citrus × sinensis), among others, are known to contain aromatic oils, the terpenes limonene and linalool, and the furanocoumarin psoralen, which are toxic to dogs, cats, and other animals. The concentration and distribution of these compounds can vary widely by species, but they are often concentrated in the fleshy rinds. Symptoms include vomiting, diarrhea, depression, and photosensitivity. Citrus essential oils do not appear to be toxic to humans.	
Lathyrus sativus	Indian pea, grass pea, chickling pea, white pea	Fabaceae	A legume grown in Asia and East Africa as an insurance crop for use during famines. Like other grain legumes, L. sativus produces a high-protein seed. The seeds contain variable amounts of β-N-Oxalyl-L-α,β-diaminopropionic acid (ODAP), a neurotoxic amino acid. ODAP causes wasting and paralysis if eaten over a long period, and is considered the cause of the disease neurolathyrism, a neurodegenerative disease that causes paralysis of the lower body and emaciation of gluteal muscle (buttocks). The disease has been seen to occur after famines in Europe (France, Spain, Germany), North Africa, and South Asia, and is still prevalent in Eritrea, Ethiopia, and parts of Afghanistan when Lathyrus seed is the exclusive or main source of nutrients for extended periods.	
Macadamia	macadamia nut, Queensland nut, bush nut, maroochi nut, or bauple nut.	Proteaceae	The nuts from Macadamia jansenii and Macadamia ternifolia contain cyanogenic glycosides. Macadamias are toxic to dogs when ingested that cause weakness and hind limb paralysis within 12 hours of ingestion. The reason for their toxicity is still unknown In high doses of toxin, opiate medication may be required for symptom relief until the toxin effects diminish, with full recovery usually within 24-48 hours. Macadamias are also toxic to cats, causing tremors, paralysis, joint stiffness, and high fever.	
Malus domestica	apple	Rosaceae	The seeds are mildly poisonous, containing a small amount of amygdalin, a cyanogenic glycoside. The quantity contained in the seeds of a single apple is usually not enough to be dangerous to humans, but it is possible to ingest enough seeds to provide a fatal dose.	
Mangifera indica	mango	Anacardiaceae	Mango leaves, stems, peels, and sap contain urushiol, an allergen also present in poison ivy, poison oak, and poison sumac that can cause urushiol-induced contact dermatitis in susceptible people. Cross-reactions between mango contact allergens and urushiol have been observed. Those with a history of poison ivy or poison oak contact dermatitis may be most at risk for such an allergic reaction. During mango's primary ripening season, it is the most common source of plant dermatitis in Hawaii.	
Manihot esculenta	cassava	Euphorbiaceae	Roots and leaves contain two cyanogenic glycosides, linamarin and lotaustralin. These are decomposed by linamarase, a naturally occurring enzyme in cassava, liberating hydrogen cyanide. Cassava varieties are often categorized as either sweet or bitter, respectively signifying the absence or presence of toxic levels of cyanogenic glycosides. The 'sweet' cultivars can produce as little as 20 milligrams of cyanide per kilogram of fresh roots, whereas bitter ones may produce more than 50 times as much (1 g/kg). Cassavas grown during drought are especially high in these toxins. A dose of 40 mg of pure cassava cyanogenic glycoside is sufficient to kill a cow. It can also cause severe calcific pancreatitis in humans, leading to chronic pancreatitis. Processing (soaking, cooking, fermentation, etc.) of cassava root is necessary to remove the toxins and avoid getting sick. In the tropics, where cassava farming is a major industry, "Chronic, low-level cyanide exposure is associated with the development of goiter and with tropical ataxic neuropathy, a nerve-damaging disorder that renders a person unsteady and uncoordinated. Severe cyanide poisoning, particularly during famines, is associated with outbreaks of a debilitating, irreversible paralytic disorder called konzo and, in some cases, death. The incidence of konzo and tropical ataxic neuropathy can be as high as 3 percent in some areas." For some smaller-rooted sweet varieties, cooking is sufficient to eliminate all toxicity. The cyanide is carried away in the processing water and the amounts produced in domestic consumption are too small to have an environmental impact. The larger-rooted, bitter varieties used for the production of flour or starch must be processed to remove the cyanogenic glycosides. Industrial production of cassava flour, even at the cottage level, may generate enough cyanide and cyanogenic glycosides in the effluvia to have a severe environmental impact.	
Myristica fragrans	nutmeg	Myristicaceae	Contains myristicin, a naturally occurring insecticide and acaricide with possible neurotoxic effects on neuroblastoma cells. It has psychoactive properties at doses much higher than used in cooking. Raw nutmeg produces anticholinergic-like symptoms, attributed to myristicin and elemicin. The intoxicating effects of myristicin can lead to a physical state somewhere between waking and dreaming; euphoria is reported and nausea is often experienced. Users also report bloodshot eyes and memory disturbances. Myristicin is also known to induce hallucinogenic effects, such as visual distortions. Nutmeg intoxication has an extremely long delay before peak is reached, sometimes taking up to seven hours, and effects can be felt for 24 hours, with lingering effects lasting up to 72 hours.	
Phaseolus lunatus	Lima bean, butter bean, sieva bean, double bean, Madagascar bean	Fabaceae	Raw beans contain dangerous amounts of linamarin, a cyanogenic glycoside.	
Phaseolus vulgaris	kidney bean, common bean	Fabaceae	Phytohaemagglutinin, a toxic lectin, is present in many varieties of common bean but is especially concentrated in red kidney beans. The lectin has several effects on cell metabolism; it induces mitosis and affects the cell membrane regarding transport and permeability to proteins. It agglutinates most mammalian red blood cell types. Consumption of as few as four or five raw kidney beans may be sufficient to trigger symptoms, which include nausea, vomiting, and diarrhea. Onset is from one to three hours after consumption of improperly prepared beans, and symptoms typically resolve within a few hours. Phytohaemagglutinin can be deactivated by cooking beans at 100 °C (212 °F) for ten minutes, which is required to degrade the toxin and is much shorter than the hours required to fully cook the beans themselves. For dry beans, the U.S. Food and Drug Administration (FDA) also recommends an initial soak of at least five hours in water, after which the soaking water should be discarded. However, lower cooking temperatures may have the paradoxical effect of potentiating the toxic effect of haemagglutinin. Beans cooked at 80 °C (176 °F) are reported to be up to five times as toxic as raw beans. Outbreaks of poisoning have been associated with the use of slow cookers, the low cooking temperatures of which may be unable to degrade the toxin.	
Prunus spp.	cherry, peach, plum, apricot, almond, etc.	Rosaceae	Leaves and seeds contain amygdalin, a cyanogenic glycoside. Many other Prunus species, such as peach (Prunus persica), plum (Prunus domestica), almond (Prunus dulcis), and apricot (Prunus armeniaca), also possess poisonous parts.	
Rheum rhaponticum	rhubarb	Polygonaceae	The leaf stalks (petioles) are edible, but the leaves themselves contain notable quantities of oxalic acid, which is a nephrotoxic and corrosive acid present in many plants. Symptoms of poisoning include kidney disorders, convulsions, and coma, though it is rarely fatal. The LD_{50} (median lethal dose) for pure oxalic acid in rats is about 375 mg/kg body weight, or about 25 grams for a 65-kilogram (143 lb) human. Although the oxalic acid content of rhubarb leaves can vary, a typical value is about 0.5%, so almost 5 kg of the extremely sour leaves would have to be consumed to reach the LD_{50}. Cooking the leaves with soda can make them more poisonous by producing soluble oxalates. However, the leaves are believed to also contain an additional, unidentified toxin, which might be an anthraquinone glycoside (also known as senna glycosides). In the edible leaf stalks, the concentration of oxalic acid is much lower, contributing only about 2–2.5% of the total acidity, which is dominated by malic acid. This means that even the raw stalks may not be hazardous (though they are generally thought to be in the US). However, the tart taste of the raw stalks is so strong as to be unpalatable to most consumers.	
Solanum lycopersicum	tomato	Solanaceae	Like many other members of the nightshade family Solanaceae, tomato leaves and stems contain solanine, a glycoalkaloid which is toxic if ingested, causing digestive upset and nervous excitement. Use of tomato leaves as an herbal tea (infusion) has been responsible for at least one death. Leaves, stems, and green unripe fruit of the tomato plant also contain small amounts of the poisonous alkaloid tomatine, although levels are generally too small to be dangerous. Ripe tomatoes do not contain any detectable tomatine. Tomato plants can be toxic to dogs if they eat large amounts of the fruit or chew the plant material.	
Solanum tuberosum	potato	Solanaceae	Potatoes contain toxic glycoalkaloids, of which the most prevalent are solanine and chaconine. Solanine is also found in other members of the Solanaceae plant family, which includes Solanum lycopersicum (tomato), Atropa belladonna (deadly nightshade), and Hyoscyamus niger (henbane) (see entries below). The concentration of glycoalkaloids in wild potatoes is sufficient to produce toxic effects in humans. The toxin affects the nervous system, causing headaches, diarrhea and intense digestive disturbances, cramps, weakness and confusion, and in severe cases coma and death. Poisoning from cultivated potatoes occurs very rarely, however, as toxic compounds in the potato plant are generally concentrated in the green portions of the plant and in the fruits, and cultivated varieties contain smaller concentrations than wild plants. Cooking at high temperatures (over 170 °C or 340 °F) also partly destroys the toxin. However, exposure to light, physical damage, and age can increase glycoalkaloid content within the tuber, with the highest concentrations occurring just underneath the skin. Tubers that are exposed to light turn green from chlorophyll synthesis, thus giving a visual clue as to areas of the tuber that may have become more toxic; however, this does not provide a definitive guide, as greening and glycoalkaloid accumulation can occur independently of each other. Some varieties of potato contain greater glycoalkaloid concentrations than others; breeders developing new cultivars try to keep solanine levels below 200 mg/kg (200 ppmw). However, when these commercial varieties turn green, even they can approach solanine concentrations of 1000 mg/kg (1000 ppmw). The U.S. National Toxicology Program suggests that the average American consume no more than 12.5 mg/day of solanine from potatoes (the toxic dose is several times this, depending on body weight).	
Vitis spp.	grape	Vitaceae	Potentially toxic to dogs, although the precise mechanism is not fully understood. See grape and raisin toxicity in dogs.	

== Other poisonous plants ==
Many other plants not commonly used in food or drink are also poisonous, and care should be taken to avoid accidentally contacting or ingesting them. Some of these are popular ornamental plants or are cultivated for purposes other than consumption.

Scientific name	Common name(s)	Family	Description	Picture
Abrus precatorius	jequirity, crab's eye, rosary pea, John Crow bead, precatory bean, Indian licorice, akar saga, giddee giddee, jumbie bead, ruti, weather plant	Fabaceae	The attractive seeds (usually about the size of a ladybug, glossy red with one black dot) contain abrin, an extremely toxic ribosome-inactivating protein related to ricin. Symptoms of poisoning include nausea, vomiting, convulsions, liver failure, and death, usually after several days. Ingesting a single seed can kill an adult human. The seeds have been used as beads in jewelry. The seeds are unfortunately attractive to children.	
Acokanthera spp.	poison arrow tree	Apocynaceae	All five species in this genus exude a sap containing extremely toxic cardiac glycosides including ouabain, which inhibits the sodium–potassium pump N^{+}/K^{+}-ATPase, a membrane transport protein important for regulating electrolyte balance and conducting action potentials in many animal cells.	
Aconitum spp.	aconite, wolfsbane, monkshood	Ranunculaceae	All parts are poisonous, containing an alkaloid called aconitine, which disables nerves, lowers blood pressure, and can stop the heart. Even casual skin contact should be avoided. Symptoms include numbness, tingling, and cardiac irregularity. It has been used as a poison for bullets (by German forces during World War II), as a bait and arrow poison (ancient Greece), and to poison water supplies (reports from ancient Asia). If ingested, it usually causes burning, tingling, and numbness in the mouth, followed by vomiting and nervous excitement. It is usually a quick-acting poison and has been used in the past for killing wolves (hence one of the common names).	
Actaea pachypoda	doll's eyes, white baneberry	Ranunculaceae	All parts are poisonous, especially the berries, the consumption of which has a sedative effect on cardiac muscle tissue and can cause cardiac arrest.	
Adenium obesum	sabi star, kudu, desert-rose	Apocynaceae	The plant exudes a highly toxic sap which is used by the Meridian High and Hadza in Tanzania to coat arrow-tips for hunting.	
Adonis vernalis	pheasant's eye, false hellebore	Ranunculaceae	The plant is poisonous, containing cardiostimulant compounds such as adonidin and aconitic acid.	
Aesculus hippocastanum	horse-chestnut, buckeye, conker tree	Sapindaceae	All parts of the raw plant are poisonous due to saponins and glycosides such as aesculin, causing nausea, muscle twitches, and sometimes paralysis.	
Agave spp.	century plant, maguey	Asparagaceae	The juice of several species causes acute contact dermatitis, with blistering lasting several weeks and recurring itching for several years thereafter.	
Ageratina altissima	white snakeroot, white sanicle, richweed	Asteraceae	All parts contain a toxic oil known as tremetol, which is poisonous to cattle, horses, goats, sheep, and humans. Symptoms of ingestion include nausea and vomiting and it is often fatal. When the milk or meat of an animal that has eaten white snakeroot is consumed in sufficient quantities by humans, tremetol poisoning, also called milk sickness, may result.	
Agrostemma githago	corn cockle	Caryophyllaceae	Contains the saponins githagin and agrostemmic acid. All parts of the plant are reported to be poisonous and may produce chronic or acute, potentially fatal poisoning, although it has been used in folk medicine to treat a range of ills, from parasites to cancer. There are no known recent clinical studies of corn cockle which provide a basis for dosage recommendations; however, doses higher than 3 g (of seeds) are considered toxic.	
Anemone nemorosa	wood anemone, windflower, thimbleweed	Ranunculaceae	The plant contains chemicals that are toxic to animals including humans, but it has also been used as a medicine. All parts of the plant contain protoanemonin, which can cause severe skin and gastrointestinal irritation, bitter taste and burning in the mouth and throat, mouth ulcers, nausea, vomiting, diarrhea, and hematemesis.	
Anthurium spp.	anthurium, tailflower, flamingo flower	Araceae	Anthurium plants are poisonous due to calcium oxalate crystals. The sap is irritating to the skin and eyes.	
Aquilegia spp.	columbine	Ranunculaceae	Seeds and roots contain cardiogenic toxins which cause both severe gastroenteritis and heart palpitations if consumed. The flowers of various species were consumed in moderation by Native Americans as a condiment with other fresh greens, and are reported to be very sweet and safe if consumed in small quantities. Native Americans also used very small amounts of the root as an effective treatment for peptic ulcers. However, medical use of this plant is difficult due to its high toxicity; columbine poisonings are easily fatal.	
Areca catechu	betel nut palm, pinyang	Arecaceae	The nut contains arecaidine and arecoline, alkaloids which are related to nicotine and similarly addictive. Chewing it causes a mild high, some stimulation, and much red saliva, which can cause nausea if swallowed. Withdrawal causes headache and sweats. Use is correlated with mouth cancer, and to a lesser extent asthma and heart disease.	
Argemone mexicana	Mexican poppy, flowering thistle, cardo, cardosanto	Papaveraceae	A. mexicana seeds contain 22–36% of a pale yellow, non-edible oil called argemone oil or katkar oil, which contains the toxic alkaloids sanguinarine and dihydrosanguinarine. Poisoning by katkar oil causes epidemic dropsy, with symptoms including extreme swelling, particularly of the legs.	
Arnica montana	mountain arnica, mountain tobacco, wolf's bane, leopard's bane	Asteraceae	It contains the toxin helenalin, which can be poisonous if large amounts of the plant are eaten or small amounts of concentrated Arnica are used. Consumption of A. montana can produce severe gastroenteritis, internal bleeding of the digestive tract, raised liver enzymes (which can indicate inflammation of the liver), nervousness, accelerated heart rate, muscular weakness, and death if enough is ingested. Contact with the plant can also cause skin irritation. In the Ames test, an extract of A. montana was found to be mutagenic. The plant's toxicity has led to the U.S. FDA officially declaring it to be unsafe.	
Arum maculatum	cuckoo-pint, lords and ladies, jack-in-the-pulpit, wake robin, wild arum, devils and angels, cows and bulls, Adam and Eve, bobbins, starch-root	Araceae	All parts of the plant are highly toxic to humans and most animals. The bright red berries contain calcium oxalate raphides and soluble oxalates of saponins (as well as trace amounts of cyanogens and coniine) which can cause skin, mouth, and throat irritation, resulting in swelling, burning pain, breathing difficulties, and stomach upset. A. maculatum is one of the most common causes of accidental plant poisoning based on attendance at hospital emergency departments. However, their acrid taste and the almost immediate tingling sensation in the mouth means that large amounts are rarely consumed and serious harm is unusual. Touching the plant can cause contact dermatitis. Fresh plant material is more toxic than dried plant parts.	
Atropa belladonna	deadly nightshade, belladonna, devil's cherry, dwale	Solanaceae	One of the most toxic plants found in the Western Hemisphere, all parts of the plant contain tropane alkaloids – as do those of its equally deadly sister species A. baetica, A. pallidiflora and A. acuminata. The active agents are atropine, hyoscine (scopolamine), and hyoscyamine, which have anticholinergic properties. The symptoms of poisoning include dilated pupils, sensitivity to light, blurred vision, tachycardia, loss of balance, staggering, headache, rash, flushing, dry mouth and throat, slurred speech, urinary retention, constipation, confusion, hallucinations, delirium, and convulsions. The root of the plant is generally the most toxic part, though this can vary from one specimen to another. Ingestion of a single leaf of the plant can be fatal to an adult. Casual contact with the leaves can cause skin pustules. The berries pose the greatest danger to children because they look attractive and have a somewhat sweet taste. The consumption of two to five berries by children and ten to twenty berries by adults can be lethal. In 2009, a case of A. belladonna being mistaken for blueberries, with six berries ingested by an adult woman, was documented to result in severe anticholinergic syndrome. The plant's deadly symptoms are caused by atropine's disruption of the parasympathetic nervous system's ability to regulate involuntary activities such as sweating, breathing, and heart rate. The antidote for atropine poisoning is physostigmine or pilocarpine. A. belladonna is also toxic to many domestic animals, causing narcosis and paralysis. However, cattle and rabbits eat the plant seemingly without any harmful effects. In humans, its anticholinergic properties will cause the disruption of cognitive capacities like memory and learning.	
Brugmansia spp.	angel's trumpet	Solanaceae	All parts of all plants in this genus contain the tropane alkaloids scopolamine and atropine, which are extremely toxic; ingestion is often fatal. These plants are closely related to and were once grouped with members of the genus Datura, which contain the same deadly alkaloids. Effects of ingestion may include losing connection with reality and hallucinations. An unfortunate case has been reported in the neuroscience literature about a young man performing self-amputation with pruning shears after intentionally ingesting Brugmansia tea, boiled from just two flowers.	
Caladium spp.	angel wings, elephant ear, heart of Jesus	Araceae	All parts of all plants in this genus contain insoluble calcium oxalate crystals, which are toxic. Symptoms of ingestion generally include irritation and burning of the mouth, lips, and throat, nausea and vomiting, abdominal pain, diarrhea, muscle twitching, and sometimes swelling of the mouth or tongue, which can cause breathing to become fatally blocked. In severe cases chronic kidney disease or renal failure can occur. They are poisonous to dogs and cats as well as humans.	
Calla palustris	marsh calla, wild calla, water-arum	Araceae	The plant is very poisonous when fresh due to its high oxalic acid content, but the rhizome (like that of Caladium, Colocasia, and Arum) is edible after drying, grinding, leaching, and boiling.	
Caltha palustris	marsh-marigold, kingcup	Ranunculaceae	It contains several active substances of which the most important from a toxicological point of view is protoanemonin. Ingesting large quantities of the plant may cause convulsions, burning of the throat, vomiting, bloody diarrhea, dizziness, and fainting. Contact of the skin or mucous membranes with the juices can cause blistering or inflammation, and gastric illness if ingested. Younger parts seem to contain lower toxin concentrations and heating breaks these substances down. Small amounts of Caltha in hay do not cause problems when fed to livestock, but larger quantities can lead to gastric illness.	
Cascabela thevetia	yellow oleander	Apocynaceae	All parts of the plant are toxic to most vertebrates as they contain cardiac glycosides. Many cases of intentional and accidental poisoning of humans are known.	
Cephalanthus occidentalis	buttonbush	Rubiaceae	It has several historical medicinal uses, but it is also toxic due to the presence of cephalanthin.	
Cerbera odollam	suicide tree, Pong Pong tree	Apocynaceae	The seeds contain cerberin, a potent toxin related to digoxin. The poison blocks the calcium ion channels in heart muscle, causing disruption of the heartbeat. This is typically fatal and can result from ingesting a single seed. Cerberin is difficult to detect in autopsies and its taste can be masked with strong spices, such as a curry. It is often used in homicide and suicide in India; Kerala's suicide rate is about three times the Indian average. In 2004, a team led by Yvan Gaillard of the Laboratory of Analytical Toxicology in La Voulte-sur-Rhône, France, documented more than 500 cases of fatal Cerbera poisoning between 1989 and 1999 in Kerala. They said "To the best of our knowledge, no plant in the world is responsible for as many deaths by suicide as the odollam tree." A related species is Cerbera tanghin, the seeds of which are known as tanghin poison nut and have been used as an 'ordeal poison'.	
Chelidonium majus	greater celandine	Papaveraceae	The whole plant is toxic in moderate doses as it contains a range of isoquinoline alkaloids, but there are claimed to be therapeutic uses when used at the correct dosage. The main alkaloid present in the herb and root is coptisine, with berberine, chelidonine, sanguinarine, and chelerythrine also present. Sanguinarine is particularly toxic with an LD_{50} of only 18 mg per kg body weight. The effect of the fresh herb is analgesic, cholagogic, antimicrobial, and oncostatic, with action as a central nervous system sedative. In animal tests, Chelidonium majus is shown to be cytostatic. Early studies showed that the latex causes contact dermatitis and eye irritation. Stains on skin of the fingers are sometimes reported to cause eye irritation after rubbing the eyes or handling contact lenses. The characteristic latex also contains proteolytic enzymes and the phytocystatin chelidostatin, a cysteine protease inhibitor.	
Chondrodendron tomentosum	curare	Menispermaceae	It contains highly toxic alkaloids and is one of the sources of the arrow poison curare – specifically 'tube curare', the name of which is derived from the name of the medicinally valuable alkaloid tubocurarine.	
Cicuta spp.	water hemlock, cowbane, wild carrot, snakeweed, poison parsnip, false parsley, children's bane, death-of-man	Apiaceae	The root, when freshly pulled out of the ground, is extremely poisonous and contains cicutoxin, a central nervous system stimulant that induces seizures. When dried, the poisonous effect is retained. The most common species is C. maculata; one of the species found in the Western United States, C. douglasii, often found in pastures and swamps, has especially thick stems and very large and sturdy flowers which are sometimes harvested for flower displays. This is inadvisable as the sap is also toxic.	
Cleistanthus collinus		Phyllanthaceae	Ingestion of its leaves or a dicoction of its leaves causes hypokalemia (kaliuresis and cardiac arrhythmias), metabolic acidosis, hypotension, and hypoxia.	
Clivia miniata	Natal lily, bush lily, Kaffir lily	Amaryllidaceae	Like many other amaryllid species, Clivia lilies contain small amounts of lycorine and other toxic alkaloids, making them poisonous to humans as well as domestic animals including dogs and cats, though large quantities must typically be ingested to cause symptoms of poisoning. The bulbs are considered the most poisonous parts. Symptoms of ingestion may include salivation, vomiting, diarrhea, low blood pressure, convulsions, tremors, and cardiac arrhythmia.	
Codiaeum variegatum	garden croton, variegated croton	Euphorbiaceae	As with many of the Euphorbiaceae, the sap can cause skin eczema in some people. The bark, roots, latex, and leaves are poisonous.	
Colchicum autumnale	autumn crocus, meadow saffron	Colchicaceae	The corms contain colchicine, a potent chemical which binds to tubulin in the cell, impairing or inhibiting a wide variety of normal cellular functions including mitosis, endocytosis and exocytosis, and cellular motility. Colchicine poisoning has been compared to arsenic poisoning; symptoms typically start two to five hours after a toxic dose has been ingested but may take up to 24 hours to appear, and include burning in the mouth and throat, fever, vomiting, diarrhea, abdominal pain, and kidney failure. Onset of multiple-system organ failure may occur within 24 to 72 hours. This includes hypovolemic shock due to extreme vascular damage and fluid loss through the GI tract, which may result in death. Additionally, those affected may experience kidney damage resulting in low urine output and bloody urine, low white blood cell counts (persisting for several days), anemia, muscular weakness, and respiratory failure. Recovery may begin within 6 to 8 days. There is no specific antidote for colchicine poisoning, although various treatments do exist. Despite dosing issues concerning its toxicity, colchicine is also a popular medicine at low doses, prescribed in the treatment of gout, familial Mediterranean fever, pericarditis, and Behçet's disease. It is also being investigated for use as an anti-cancer drug. Certain drugs and conditions can interfere with colchicine metabolism and abruptly increase its toxicity, giving colchicine a reputation for dangerous drug interactions.	
Conium maculatum	hemlock, poison hemlock, spotted parsley, spotted cowbane, bad-man's oatmeal, poison snakeweed, beaver poison	Apiaceae	All parts of the plant contain γ-coniceine and its derivative coniine, as well as similar alkaloids, which are toxic to all mammals and many other organisms. Ingestion can cause stomach pain, vomiting, and progressive paralysis of the central nervous system; ingestion of more than 100 milligrams of coniine (equal to about six to eight fresh leaves, or even smaller doses of the seeds and roots) can be fatal for adult humans. Coniine works primarily by inhibiting nicotinic acetylcholine receptors in nerve cells, which can cause narcotic-like effects as soon as 30 minutes after ingestion, followed by an ascending neuromuscular dysfunction leading to paralysis of the respiratory muscles and ultimately death by oxygen deprivation. Contrary to a common myth, scientific studies have disproven that humans can be exposed to hemlock alkaloids by ingesting the milk or meat of animals which have eaten the plant. C. maculatum should not be confused with the trees commonly called hemlock (Tsuga spp.), which, while not edible, are not nearly as toxic as the herbaceous plant. An infusion of poison hemlock is said to have killed Socrates in 399 BC.	
Consolida spp.	larkspur	Ranunculaceae	Young plants and seeds are poisonous, causing nausea, muscle twitches, and paralysis; often fatal. Other plants in the parent genus Delphinium are also poisonous and commonly called larkspur.	
Convallaria majalis	lily of the valley	Asparagaceae	Contains at least 38 different cardiac glycosides, including convallarin, which liberate hydrogen cyanide when metabolized in the body. All parts of the plant, including the bright red berries, are extremely poisonous. Symptoms of ingestion may include abdominal pain, nausea, vomiting, and irregular heartbeat.	
Coriaria myrtifolia	redoul	Coriariaceae	A Mediterranean plant containing the toxin coriamyrtin, ingestion of which produces digestive, neurological, and respiratory problems. The poisonous fruits superficially resemble blackberries and may mistakenly be eaten as such. Can be fatal in children.	
Cycas revoluta	sago cycad, sago palm, king sago, Japanese sago palm	Cycadaceae	All parts of the plant are toxic; however, the seeds contain the highest level of the toxin cycasin. Cycasin causes gastrointestinal irritation, and in high enough doses, leads to liver failure. Other toxins include Beta-methylamino L-alanine, a neurotoxic amino acid, and an unidentified toxin which has been observed to cause hindlimb paralysis in cattle.	
Cytisus scoparius	broom, common broom	Fabaceae	Contains toxic alkaloids that depress the heart and nervous system. The alkaloid sparteine is a class 1a antiarrhythmic agent, a sodium channel blocker. It is not FDA-approved for human use as an antiarrhythmic agent and it is not included in the Vaughn Williams classification of antiarrhythmic drugs.	
Daphne spp.	daphne, garland flower, mezereum, spurge laurel	Thymelaeaceae	All parts of all species in this genus, especially the berries (variously red, yellow, blue, or black), are highly toxic, the primary active principle being the glycoside daphnin; some species also contain mezerein. Ingestion of even just a few berries can produce a burning sensation in the mouth, severe abdominal pain, vomiting, bloody diarrhea, weakness, stupor, and convulsions, followed by coma; it is often fatal. Corrosive lesions of the oral mucosa and upper gastrointestinal tract may also occur, and nephritis has been reported. The sap and berry juice may cause allergic dermatitis in sensitive individuals.	
Datura spp.	jimson weed, thorn apple, stinkweed, Jamestown weed, angel's trumpets, moonflower, sacred datura	Solanaceae	Containing the tropane alkaloids scopolamine, hyoscyamine, and atropine, all parts of these plants are poisonous, especially the seeds and flowers. Ingestion may cause abnormal thirst, hyperthermia, severe delirium and incoherence, visual distortions, bizarre and possibly violent behavior, memory loss, coma, and death. It is a significant poison to grazing livestock in North America. Datura has been used as an entheogenic drug by the indigenous peoples of the Americas and others for centuries, though the extreme variability in a given plant's toxicity depending on its age and growing environment make such usage an exceptionally hazardous practice; the difference between a recreational dose and a lethal dose is minuscule, and incorrect dosage often results in death. For this same reason, Datura has also been a popular poison for suicide and murder, particularly in parts of Europe and India. Reports of recreational usage are overwhelmingly negative. The majority of those who describe their use of Datura find their experiences extremely unpleasant and often physically dangerous.	
Daucus carota	wild carrot, bird's nest, bishop's lace, Queen Anne's lace	Apiaceae	D. carota contains falcarinol, which is dangerously toxic to humans. It has also been reported to contain acetone, asarone, choline, ethanol, formic acid, hydrogen cyanide, isobutyric acid, limonene, malic acid, maltose, oxalic acid, palmitic acid, pyrrolidine, and quinic acid. When in contact with wet D. carota, skin irritation and vesication may occur.	
Deathcamas	Various genera in the family Melanthiaceae have species whose common names include "deathcamas", including Amianthium, Anticlea, Stenanthium, Toxicoscordion, and Zigadenus.	Melanthiaceae	All parts of these plants are toxic, due to the presence of alkaloids. Grazing animals, such as sheep and cattle, may be affected and human fatalities have occurred.	
Delphinium spp.	larkspur	Ranunculaceae	Contains the alkaloid delsoline. Young plants and seeds are poisonous, causing nausea, muscle twitches, paralysis, and often death.	
Dermatophyllum secundiflorum	mescal bean, Texas mountain laurel	Fabaceae	The beans contain an extremely toxic psychotropic bicyclic alkaloid, cytisine. Which is related to nicotine. The consumption of one bean is enough to kill an adult.	
Dicentra cucullaria	bleeding heart, Dutchman's breeches	Papaveraceae	All parts of the plant contain neurotoxic alkaloids such as isoquinoline and cucullarine, which are known to be poisonous to cats, cattle, and humans. Cattle grazing on the leaves or bulblets may suffer from breathing difficulties, staggering, and convulsions, sometimes fatally. The plant may also cause contact dermatitis if touched.	
Dichapetalum cymosum	gifblaar	Dichapetalaceae	Well known as a livestock poison in South Africa, all parts of this plant (with the exception of the flesh of the fruit) contain the metabolic poison fluoroacetic acid. Young sprouts tend to have the highst concentrations. The compound itself is not toxic but undergoes lethal synthesis while reacting with coenzyme A, yielding fluoroacetyl-coenzyme A. This compound then reacts with oxaloacetate to form fluorocitrate, which binds irreversibly to aconitase and thereby competes with normal citrate as a substrate, causing disruption to the Krebs cycle and severe inhibition of cellular respiration. In cattle, death by acute cardiac arrest is seen following drinking or some kind of exertion. Affected animals may show early dyspnoea and arrhythmias. There may also be neurological signs such as trembling, twitching and convulsions. Death occurs 4 to 24 hours after ingestion. Poisoning of carnivores, including dogs, has been reported after consumption of ruminal contents of poisoned animals. No confirmed therapeutic measures have been developed for the prevention or treatment of gifblaar poisoning.	
Dieffenbachia spp.	dumbcane	Araceae	All parts are poisonous; the culprits are needle-shaped crystals of calcium oxalate called raphides, which can cause intense burning, reddening of the skin, irritation, and immobility of the tongue, mouth, and throat if ingested. Swelling can be severe enough to block breathing, leading to death, though this is rare; in most cases, symptoms are mild and can be successfully treated with basic analgesics, antihistamines, or charcoal.	
Digitalis purpurea	foxglove	Plantaginaceae	The leaves, seeds, and flowers are poisonous, containing cardiac or other steroid glycosides. These cause irregular heartbeat, general digestive upset, and confusion; can be fatal.	
Dioscorea communis	black bryony	Dioscoreaceae	All components of the plant, including the tubers, are poisonous due to saponin content, therefore it is not typically used internally. However, it has been used as a poultice for bruises and inflamed joints. It has been suggested that black bryony be used topically with caution, due to a tendency for the plant to cause painful blisters. Studies have isolated calcium oxalate deposits and histamines in the berry juice and rhizomes, which may contribute to skin irritation and contact dermatitis.	
Dryopteridaceae	wood ferns, buckler ferns, male ferns	Dryopteridaceae	The rhizomes of this family are known to contain phloroglucinol derived compounds, previously used to treat nematode infections. Dryopteris filix-mas poisonings consist of vomiting, diarrhea, vertigo, headache, tremor, cold sweats, dyspnea, cyanosis, convulsions, mental disturbances, visual impairment, or blindness which may be temporary or permanent. There is some record of Rumohra adiantiformis (formerly Arachnoides adiantiformis) causing contact dermatitis.	
Duranta erecta	golden dewdrop, pigeon berry, skyflower	Verbenaceae	The leaves and berries of the plant are toxic and are confirmed to have killed children, dogs, and cats.	
Erysimum cheiri	wallflower	Brassicaceae	It contains constituents that may affect the heart.	
Euonymus europaeus	spindle, European spindle, spindle tree	Celastraceae	The fruit is poisonous, containing among other substances the alkaloids theobromine and caffeine, as well as an extremely bitter terpene. Poisonings are more common in young children, who are enticed by the brightly coloured fruits. Ingestion can result in liver and kidney damage and even death. There are many other species of Euonymus, many of which are also poisonous.	
Euphorbia pulcherrima	poinsettia	Euphorbiaceae	Contrary to a popular myth, poinsettias are only very mildly toxic, if at all, and in most contexts are considered non-toxic both to humans and domestic pets; a review of more than 22,000 reported cases of poinsettia exposure, the majority of which occurred in children, found that 92% of those exposed did not develop any symptoms at all, and no deaths resulting from ingestion of any part of the poinsettia plant have ever been documented. Contact with the plant usually has no effect, though its latex can cause an allergic reaction in sensitive individuals. It may also be mildly irritating to the skin or stomach and sometimes causes diarrhea and vomiting if eaten. Sap introduced into the human eye may cause temporary blindness. Poinsettia is similarly only mildly toxic to cats, dogs, and horses, and very rarely necessitates veterinary treatment.	
Excoecaria agallocha	milky mangrove, blind-your-eye mangrove, river poison tree	Euphorbiaceae	Contact with latex can cause skin irritation and blistering; eye contact can cause temporary blindness.	
Galanthus nivalis	snowdrop	Amaryllidaceae	The leaves and especially the bulbs contain phenanthridine alkaloids including lycorine and narciclasine, both of which have been investigated for potential toxicity as well as medicinal uses. Lycorine in particular has been shown to have cytostatic antitumor effects which may be useful in the treatment of certain cancers; in mice, no symptoms of toxicity were observed when lycorine was administered chronically for several days in doses up to 80 mg/kg, indicating that the median tolerated dose of lycorine is very large. Ingestion of the bulbs has been implicated in accidental poisonings in Holland during food shortages in World War II, though large quantities are necessary to produce toxic reactions; eating the plant may cause gastrointestinal problems in humans, and it is therefore considered mildly toxic both to humans and domestic mammals. G. nivalis also produces an active agglutinin protein known as GNA, which due to its insecticidal properties has been introduced into some varieties of genetically modified potatoes to protect them from insect pests. A controversial experiment conducted in the 1990s reported gastrointestinal and immune system damage in rats fed these potatoes, though the study was later criticized for methodological flaws.	
Gelsemium sempervirens	Carolina jessamine, yellow jessamine, evening trumpet vine	Gelsemiaceae	Phytochemical studies have revealed that all parts of all species are rich in iridoids and alkaloids including gelsemine, koumine, gelsenicine, and gelsevirine; concentrations are especially high in the roots. The median lethal dose of a crude alkaloidal extraction isolated from Gelsemium elegans was determined to be 1.2 mg/kg when given to mice intravenously. The alkaloids act on nerve endings causing paralysis, muscle weakness, and clonic convulsions. Typical symptoms of intoxication include sweating, dizziness, nausea, vomiting, blurred vision, muscular weakness, limb paralysis, dilated pupils, breathing difficulty, coma, and convulsion. At high doses the alkaloids act centrally on the nervous system against the neurotransmitter gamma-amino butyric acid (GABA), causing depression of the nervous system and death by respiratory failure. Livestock are at greatest risk of eating the plants in winter as the plants are evergreen and the leaves remain attractive when all other forage is not. It is possible to become ill from ingesting honey made from jessamine nectar.	
Gloriosa superba	flame lily, climbing lily, gloriosa lily, fire lily	Colchicaceae	The plant is toxic enough to cause human and animal fatalities if ingested. Every part of the plant is poisonous, especially the tuberous rhizomes. As with other members of the Colchicaceae, this plant contains high levels of colchicine, a toxic alkaloid. It also contains the alkaloid gloriocine. Within a few hours of the ingestion of a toxic amount of plant material, a victim may experience nausea, vomiting, numbness and tingling around the mouth, burning in the throat, abdominal pain, and bloody diarrhea. As the toxic syndrome progresses, rhabdomyolysis, ileus, respiratory depression, hypotension, coagulopathy, haematuria, altered mental status, seizures, coma, and ascending polyneuropathy may occur.	
Grevillea spp.	silky oak, spiderflower	Proteaceae	A few species such as Grevillea 'Robyn Gordon', G. robusta, G. banksii, G. bipinnatifida, and others can cause severe contact dermatitis.	
Gymnocladus dioicus	Kentucky coffee tree, American coffee berry, Kentucky mahogany, nicker tree, stump tree	Caesalpinioideae	Leaves, seeds, and fruit pulp contain low concentrations of a toxic alkaloid known as cytisine. Ingestion of sufficient quantities can cause congestion of the lungs, respiratory failure, coma, and death in both humans and domestic animals such as cattle and sheep.	
Hedera helix	common ivy	Araliaceae	The leaves and berries contain an expansive variety of saponins, and some people also have allergic reactions to ivy. Ivy extract is included in some cough medicines as an expectorant. Ingestion of ivy extracts has been associated with gastrointestinal symptoms including nausea and vomiting and allergic reactions such as skin rash in some people. Merely touching the plant can also sometimes cause contact dermatitis.	
Heliotropium indicum	Indian heliotrope	Boraginaceae	It contains tumorigenic pyrrolizidine alkaloids.	
Helleborus niger	Christmas rose	Ranunculaceae	Contains protoanemonin, or ranunculin, which has an acrid taste and can cause burning of the eyes, mouth, and throat, oral ulceration, gastroenteritis, and hematemesis.	
Heracleum mantegazzianum	giant hogweed	Apiaceae	The sap is phototoxic, causing phytophotodermatitis (severe skin inflammation) when affected skin is exposed to sunlight or to UV rays. Initially the skin becomes red and starts itching.Then blisters form as the reaction continues over 48 hours. They form black or purplish scars, which can last several years. Hospitalization may be necessary.	
Heracleum sosnowskyi	Sosnowsky's hogweed	Apiaceae	Like H. mantegazzianum, all parts of H. sosnowskyi contain phototoxic furanocoumarins, including its essential oils, even small drops of which can cause photodermatitis upon direct contact with the skin and exposure to sunlight. Human skin contact often results in burns, mainly of the second and third degree. Typical symptoms include pain, redness, swelling, and heat in the area of exposure; how long they last depends on the burn's depth and area and also on the duration of exposure. The plant is mostly hazardous to humans and less dangerous for animals that have thick hair to protect them from the sun.	
Hippomane mancinella	manchineel	Euphorbiaceae	All parts of this tree, including the fruit, contain toxic phorbol esters typical of the Euphorbiaceae. Specifically the tree contains 12-deoxy-5-hydroxyphorbol-6gamma, 7alpha-oxide, hippomanins, mancinellin, sapogenin, and phloracetophenone-2, and 4-dimethylether is present in the leaves, while the fruits possess physostigmine. Contact with the milky white latex produces strong allergic dermatitis. Standing beneath the tree during rain can cause blistering of the skin from even a small drop of rain with the latex in it. Burning tree parts may cause blindness if the smoke reaches the eyes. The fruit can also be fatal if eaten. Many trees carry a warning sign, while others have been marked with a red "X" on the trunk to indicate danger. In the French Antilles the trees are often marked with a painted red band a few feet above the ground. The Caribs used the latex of this tree to poison their arrows and would tie captives to the trunk of the tree, ensuring a slow and painful death. A poultice of arrowroot (Maranta arundinacea) was used by the Arawaks and Taíno as an antidote against such arrow poisons. The Caribs were also known to poison the water supply of their enemies with the leaves. Spanish explorer Juan Ponce de León was struck by an arrow that had been poisoned with manchineel sap during battle with the Calusa in Florida, dying shortly thereafter.	
Hyacinthus orientalis	common hyacinth	Asparagaceae	The bulbs are poisonous, causing nausea, vomiting, gasping, convulsions, and possibly death. Even handling the bulbs can cause skin irritation.	
Hydrangea spp.	hydrangea, hortensia	Hydrangeaceae	Hydrangeas are moderately toxic if eaten, with all parts of the plant containing cyanogenic glycosides.	
Hyoscyamus niger	henbane	Solanaceae	Seeds and foliage contain hyoscyamine, scopolamine and other tropane alkaloids. Can produce dilated pupils, hallucinations, increased heart rate, convulsions, vomiting, hypertension and ataxia.	
Ilex aquifolium	European holly	Aquifoliaceae	Leaves, bark, and berries contain a variety of potentially harmful substances including saponins, triterpenes, polyphenols, methylxanthines, and cyanogenic compounds (though the latter two do not appear to contribute significantly to toxicity when ingested by animals). The berries are generally considered most toxic to humans, causing nausea, vomiting, abdominal pain, and diarrhea. Ingestion of even just a few berries may be sufficient to cause gastrointestinal upset in children, the primary culprit being the saponins; stupor and drowsiness are sometimes seen in children who ingest very large quantities. In dogs and cats, the primary symptom is also gastrointestinal irritation, though this is generally mild to moderate; hypersalivation, vomiting, diarrhea, head shaking, and smacking of the lips are common signs of holly ingestion. Eating large amounts of the leaves may cause foreign body obstruction though this is uncommon. Extracts from holly leaves were lethal when injected into mice, though fruit extracts did not produce any symptoms of toxicity. Besides their chemical content, the spiny leaves may also cause mechanical damage to the body.	
Iris sibirica	Siberian iris, Siberian flag	Iridaceae	Most parts of the plant are poisonous (rhizome and leaves), if mistakenly ingested can cause stomach pains and vomiting. Also handling the plant may cause a skin irritation or an allergic reaction.	
Jacobaea vulgaris	ragwort	Asteraceae	Contains many different alkaloids, including jacobine, jaconine, jacozine, otosenine, retrorsine, seneciphylline, senecionine, and senkirkine. Poisonous to livestock and hence of concern to people who keep horses and cattle. Horses do not normally eat fresh ragwort due to its bitter taste, however it loses this taste when dried, and becomes dangerous in hay. The result, if sufficient quantity is consumed, can be irreversible cirrhosis of the liver. Signs that a horse has been poisoned include yellow mucous membranes, depression, and lack of coordination. The danger is that the toxin can have a cumulative effect; the alkaloid does not accumulate in the liver but a breakdown product can damage DNA and progressively kills cells. Jacobaea vulgaris is also theoretically poisonous to humans, although poisoning is unlikely as it is distasteful and not used as a food. However, some sensitive individuals can develop an allergic skin reaction after handling the plant because, like many members of the family Compositae, it contains sesquiterpine lactones (which are different from the pyrrolizidine alkaloids responsible for the toxic effects), which can cause compositae dermatitis.	
Kalanchoe delagoensis	mother of millions	Crassulaceae	Contains bufadienolide cardiac glycosides which can cause cardiac poisoning, particularly in grazing animals. During 1997, 125 head of cattle died after eating mother-of-millions on a travelling stock reserve near Moree, New South Wales, Australia.	
Kalmia latifolia	mountain laurel	Ericaceae	Contains andromedotoxin and arbutin. The green parts of the plant, flowers, twigs, and pollen are all toxic, and symptoms of toxicity begin to appear about six hours following ingestion. Poisoning produces anorexia, repeated swallowing, profuse salivation, depression, incoordination, vomiting, frequent defecation, watering of the eyes, irregular or difficult breathing, weakness, cardiac distress, convulsions, coma, and eventually death. Autopsy will show gastrointestinal irritation and hemorrhage.	
Laburnum spp.	golden chain	Fabaceae	All parts of the plant and especially the seeds are poisonous and can be lethal if consumed in excess. The main toxin is cytisine, a nicotinic receptor agonist. Symptoms of poisoning may include intense sleepiness, vomiting, excitement, staggering, convulsive movements, slight frothing at the mouth, unequally dilated pupils, coma and death. In some cases, diarrhea is very severe and at times the convulsions are markedly tetanic.	
Lamprocapnos spectabilis	bleeding heart	Papaveraceae	Contact with the plant can cause skin irritation in some people from isoquinoline-like alkaloids.	
Lantana camara	big-sage, wild-sage, tickberry	Verbenaceae	The toxicity of L. camara to humans is undetermined, with several studies suggesting that ingesting unripe berries can be toxic to humans. Other studies have found evidence which suggests that ingestion of L. camara fruit poses no risk to humans and are in fact edible when ripe.	
Ligustrum spp.	privet, amur, wax-leaf	Oleaceae	The berries and leaves of several species are mildly toxic to humans, dogs, cats, livestock, rabbits, and tortoises, containing terpenoid glycosides which can cause extreme irritation to the hands and mouth upon contact and digestive distress if ingested; children and small animals are particularly susceptible. The berries also contain the phenylpropanoid glucoside syringin, ingestion of which can cause nausea, headache, abdominal pain, vomiting, diarrhea, weakness, low blood pressure, and low body temperature. Eating privet may also cause digestive upset, respiratory difficulties, and nervous symptoms such as loss of coordination, and in very rare cases can be fatal. Privet is one of several plants which are poisonous to horses. Where privet grows in abundance, pollen from the flowers is a seasonal allergen which may cause respiratory irritation and can trigger asthma attacks and eczema in patients. It is banned from sale or cultivation in New Zealand due to the effects of its pollen on people with asthma. Chinese privet has also been used in traditional medicine to treat a variety of ailments, especially in the form of an herbal tea or decoction made from the leaves or bark.	
Lilium spp.	lily	Liliaceae	Most have an unidentified water-soluble toxin found in all parts of the plant. Extremely poisonous, yet attractive, to cats, causing acute renal failure; as few as two petals of the flowers can kill.	
Lolium temulentum	darnel, poison ryegrass	Poaceae	The seeds and seed heads of this common garden weed may contain the alkaloids temuline and loliine. Some experts also point to the fungus ergot or fungi of the genus Endoconidium, both of which grow on the seed heads of rye grasses, as an additional source of toxicity.	
Lupinus spp.	lupin, lupine	Fabaceae	Some varieties have edible seeds. Sweet lupines have less and bitter lupines more of the toxic alkaloids lupinine and sparteine.	
Lycoris radiata	red spider lily, red magic lily, corpse flower, equinox flower	Amaryllidaceae	The bulb contains the chemical Lycorine that causes abdominal pain, salivation, shivering, nausea, vomiting, and diarrhea.	
Malus florentina	Florentine crabapple	Rosaceae	All members of this genus contain the toxin hydrogen cyanide in their seeds and possibly also in their leaves.	
Mandragora officinarum	mandrake	Solanaceae	Alkaloids present in the fresh plant or the dried root included atropine, hyoscyamine, scopolamine (hyoscine), scopine, cuscohygrine, apoatropine, 3-alpha-tigloyloxytropane, 3-alpha,6-beta-ditigloyloxytropane and belladonnines. Non-alkaloid constituents included sitosterol and beta-methylesculetin (scopoletin). The alkaloids make the plant, in particular the root and leaves, poisonous, via anticholinergic, hallucinogenic, and hypnotic effects. Anticholinergic properties can lead to asphyxiation.	
Marah oreganus	Oregon manroot, coastal manroot, bigroot, western wild cucumber	Cucurbitaceae	All parts of the plant are poisonous, especially the seeds and the large, bitter-tasting, cucumber-like fruits, probably due to toxic cucurbitacins.	
Melia azedarach	Chinaberry tree, Cape lilac, syringa berrytree	Meliaceae	Fruits are poisonous to humans if eaten in quantity. The toxins are neurotoxins and unidentified resins found mainly in the fruits. The first symptoms of poisoning appear a few hours after ingestion. They may include loss of appetite, vomiting, constipation or diarrhea, bloody faeces, stomach pain, pulmonary congestion, cardiac arrest, rigidity, lack of coordination and general weakness. Death may take place after about 24 hours.	
Melianthus major	honeybush	Francoaceae	The entire plant is poisonous to humans and animals but especially the roots, which contain cardiac glycosides.	
Menispermum spp.	moonseed	Menispermaceae	The fruits and seeds are poisonous, causing nausea and vomiting; often fatal.	
Mentha pulegium	pennyroyal, pennyrile	Lamiaceae	It is toxic to humans and has differing effects dependent on the volume and concentration ingested. The most concentrated and toxic form of the pennyroyal plant is pennyroyal oil. The oil contains 80% to 92% of cyclohexanone pulegone. Pulegone is the molecule in highest concentration, causes a variety of ailments in those who ingest it and is what causes the plant to have its peppermint flavor. Symptoms that may persist after ingesting a small dose (<10 mL) of pennyroyal oil are nausea, vomiting, abdominal pain and dizziness. Larger volumes may result in multiorgan failure that could lead to death.	
Narcissus spp.	daffodil, narcissus, jonquil	Amaryllidaceae	All parts are toxic, symptoms include nausea, vomiting, diarrhea, and abdominal pain. Due to the bulb of the plant containing most of the lycorine eating it can cause severe irritation of the mouth and stomach. Usually non lethal as symptoms clear within hours	
Nerium oleander	oleander	Apocynaceae	All parts are toxic, the leaves and woody stems in particular. Contains nerioside, oleandroside, saponins and cardiac glycosides. Causes severe digestive upset, heart trouble and contact dermatitis.The smoke of burning oleander can cause reactions in the lungs, and can be fatal.	
Nicandra physalodes	apple-of-Peru, shoo-fly plant	Solanaceae	The whole plant is said to be toxic (according to some sources, very toxic) and to be used medicinally as a diuretic, sedative, and cough medicine.	
Nicotiana glauca	tree tobacco	Solanaceae	It contains the toxic alkaloid anabasine. Ingestion of the leaves can be fatal.	
Notobubon galbanum	blister bush	Apiaceae	All parts are poisonous, causing painful blistering upon contact that is intensified with exposure to sunlight.	
Oenanthe crocata	hemlock water dropwort	Apiaceae	Contains oenanthotoxin. The leaves may be eaten safely by livestock, but the stems and especially the carbohydrate-rich roots are much more poisonous. Animals familiar with eating the leaves may eat the roots when these are exposed during ditch clearance – one root is sufficient to kill a cow, and human fatalities are also known in these circumstances. Scientists at the University of Eastern Piedmont in Italy claimed to have identified this as the plant responsible for producing the sardonic grin, and it is the most-likely candidate for the "sardonic herb", which was a neurotoxic plant used for the ritual killing of elderly people in Phoenician Sardinia. When these people were unable to support themselves, they were intoxicated with this herb and then dropped from a high rock or beaten to death. Criminals were also executed in this way.	
Paris quadrifolia	herb-paris	Melanthiaceae	Each plant only produces one blueberry-like berry, which is poisonous, as are other tissues of the plant. Paris quadrifolia poisonings are rare, because the plant's solitary berry and its repulsive taste make it difficult to mistake it for a blueberry.	
Parthenocissus quinquefolia	Virginia creeper	Vitaceae	Flowering vine in the grape family Vitaceae. The species is native to eastern and central North America, with its range extending from south-eastern Canada and the eastern United States, west to Manitoba and Utah, and as far south as eastern Mexico and Guatemala. It has been introduced globally and is considered an invasive species to varying degrees in the European Union, the United Kingdom, China, Australia, and Cuba. Reactions are similar to poison ivy.	
Passiflora caerulea	blue passionflower, common passionflower	Passifloraceae	The leaves contain cyanogenic glycoside, which breaks down into cyanide.	
Phoradendron spp.	American mistletoe; see also the related genus Viscum	Santalaceae	Mistletoe is a common hemiparasite of trees and shrubs. Toxicity varies by species, but all parts of the plant, especially the leaves and berries, contain an array of dangerous chemicals, including proteins called phoratoxins and toxic alkaloids. Symptoms are very similar to those produced by Viscum species and may include acute gastrointestinal discomfort, diarrhea, weak pulse and/or slow heart rate, and even seizures; it is rarely lethal to adult humans, however, and many wild animals are adapted to eating its fruit.	
Physostigma venenosum	calabar beans, ordeal beans	Fabaceae	The toxin in the seeds is the parasympathomimetic alkaloid physostigmine, a reversible cholinesterase inhibitor. Symptoms of poisoning include copious saliva, nausea, vomiting, diarrhea, anorexia, dizziness, headache, stomach pain, sweating, dyspepsia and seizures., and can lead to cholinergic syndrome or "SLUDGE syndrome". Medicinal uses of physostigmine include the treatment of myasthenia gravis, glaucoma, Alzheimer's disease and delayed gastric emptying.	
Phytolacca spp.	pokeweed	Phytolaccaceae	Leaves, berries, and roots contain phytolaccatoxin and phytolaccigenin. The toxicity of young leaves can be reduced with repeated boiling and draining. Ingestion of poisonous parts of the plant may cause severe stomach cramping, persistent diarrhea, nausea, vomiting (sometimes bloody), slow and difficult breathing, weakness, spasms, hypertension, severe convulsions, and death. The poisonous principles are found in highest concentrations in the rootstock, then in leaves and stems and then in the ripe fruit. The plant generally gets more toxic with maturity, with the exception of the berries (which have significant toxicity even while green).	
Pieris japonica	Japanese pieris	Ericaceae	The plant is poisonous if consumed by people or animals.	
Plumeria spp.	frangipani	Apocynaceae	Contact with the milky latex may irritate eyes and skin.	
Podophyllum peltatum	mayapple, American mandrake, ground lemon	Berberidaceae	Green portions of the plant, unripe fruit, and especially the rhizome contain a non-alkaloid lignin known as podophyllotoxin at concentrations ranging from 0.3% to 1.0% by mass, ingestion of which can cause severe gastroenteritis, diarrhea, and depression of the central nervous system. The ripened yellow fruit is generally considered edible in modest quantities. Podophyllotoxin is a powerful antimitotic agent which works by binding tubulin and preventing cell division, and some variants may inhibit the activity of DNA-binding enzymes such as polymerases and topoisomerases. These characteristics also give podophyllotoxin and its derivatives cathartic, purgative, antiviral, vesicant, antihelminthic, and antitumor properties as well, making them useful in many medical applications, including as a topical escharotic for removing warts caused by human papillomavirus (HPV) infections and in treating some cancers.	
Prunus laurocerasus	cherry laurel, common laurel, English laurel	Rosaceae	Leaves, fruits, and seeds may cause severe discomfort to humans if ingested. The seeds contained within the cherries are poisonous like the rest of the plant, containing cyanogenic glycosides and amygdalin. This chemical composition is what gives the smell of almonds when the leaves are crushed. Laurel water, a distillation made from the plant, contains prussic acid and other compounds and is toxic.	
Prunus padus	bird cherry, hackberry, Mayday tree	Rosaceae	The glycosides prulaurasin and amygdalin, which can be poisonous, are present in some parts of P. padus, including the leaves, stems, and fruits.	
Pteridium aquilinum	bracken	Dennstaedtiaceae	Carcinogenic to humans and animals such as mice, rats, horses, and cattle when ingested. The carcinogenic compound is ptaquiloside or PTQ, which can leach from the plant into the water supply, which may explain an increase in the incidence of gastric and oesophageal cancers in humans in bracken-rich areas.	
Pulsatilla cernua	pasque flower, wind flower, prairie crocus, meadow anemone	Ranunculaceae	It is highly toxic, and produces cardiogenic toxins and oxytoxins which slow the heart in humans. Excess use can lead to diarrhea, vomiting and convulsions, hypotension and coma.	
Quercus spp.	oak	Fagaceae	The leaves and acorns of oak species are poisonous in large amounts to humans and livestock, including cattle, horses, sheep and goats, but not pigs. Poisoning is caused by the toxin tannic acid, which causes gastroenteritis, heart trouble, contact dermatitis and kidney damage. Symptoms of poisoning include lack of appetite, depression, constipation, diarrhea (which may contain blood), blood in urine, and colic; it is rarely fatal, however, and in fact after proper processing acorns are consumed as a staple food in many parts of the world.	
Rhamnus cathartica	buckthorn	Rhamnaceae	The seeds and leaves are mildly poisonous for people and animals, but are readily eaten by birds.	
Rhododendron spp.	azalea	Ericaceae	All parts are poisonous and cause nausea, vomiting, depression, breathing difficulties, and coma, though it is rarely fatal. The primary source of toxicity is a group of closely related compounds called grayanotoxins, which block sodium ion channels in cellular membranes and prevent electrical repolarization during action potentials. Honey made from the nectar of Rhododendron plants may contain dangerous concentrations of grayanotoxins, and has been historically used as a poison and in alcoholic drinks.	
Rhododendron ferrugineum	alpenrose, snow-rose, rusty-leaved alpenrose	Ericaceae	It is moderately toxic, containing arbutin, arecoline and rhodoxanthin, and can cause vomiting, and difficulties of the digestive, nervous, respiratory and circulatory systems.	
Rhododendron luteum	yellow azalea, honeysuckle azalea	Ericaceae	Despite the sweet perfume of the flowers, the nectar is toxic, containing grayanotoxin; records of poisoning of people eating the honey date back to the 4th century BC in Classical Greece.	
Rhododendron tomentosum	marsh Labrador tea, wild rosemary	Ericaceae	All parts of the plant contain poisonous terpenes that affect the central nervous system. First symptoms of overdose are dizziness and disturbances in movement, followed by spasms, nausea, and unconsciousness. The mere smell of the plant may cause headache to some people.	
Ricinus communis	castor oil plant, castor bean, Palma Christi	Euphorbiaceae	The seeds contain ricin, an extremely toxic and water-soluble ribosome-inactivating protein; it is also present in lower concentrations in other parts of the plant. Also present are ricinine, an alkaloid, and an irritant oil. According to the 2007 edition of the Guinness Book of World Records, the castor oil plant is the most poisonous in the world, though its cousin abrin, found in the seeds of the jequirity plant, is arguably more lethal. Castor oil, long used as a laxative, muscle rub, and in cosmetics, is made from the seeds, but the ricin protein is denatured during processing. Ricin quickly and irreversibly inhibits ribosomes, the molecular machines responsible for producing proteins in all cells. The LD_{50} in adults is only about 22 μg/kg when injected or inhaled; ingested ricin is much less toxic due to the digestive activity of peptidases, although a dose of 20 to 30 mg/kg, or about 4 to 8 seeds, can still cause death via this route. Reports of actual poisoning are relatively rare. If ingested, symptoms may be delayed by up to 36 hours but commonly begin within 2–4 hours. These include a burning sensation in the mouth and throat, abdominal pain, purging, and bloody diarrhea. Within several days there is severe dehydration, a drop in blood pressure and a decrease in urine. Unless treated, death can be expected to occur within 3–5 days; if they have not died by this time, they often recover. Toxicity varies among animal species: 4 seeds will kill a rabbit, 5 a sheep, 6 an ox or horse, 7 a pig, and 11 a dog. Ducks have shown substantial resistance to the seeds: it takes an average of 80 to kill them. Poisoning occurs when animals ingest broken seeds or break the seed by chewing; intact seeds may pass through the digestive tract without releasing the toxin.	
Robinia spp.	black locust, false acacia	Fabaceae	All species produce toxic lectins. The poison is a complex mix of lectins with the highest concentration in the fruits and seeds, followed by the root bark and the flowers. There is little poison in the leaves. The lectins, generally called robin, are less toxic than those of e.g. Abrus (abrin) or Ricinus (ricin), and in non-fatal cases the toxic effects tend to be temporary.	
Sambucus spp.	elder, elderberry	Adoxaceae	The roots, twigs, leaves, and unripe fruit are considered poisonous and cause nausea and digestive upset.Ripe berries must be cooked before consumption.	
Sanguinaria canadensis	bloodroot	Papaveraceae	The rhizome contains morphine-like benzylisoquinoline alkaloids, primarily the toxin sanguinarine. Sanguinarine kills animal cells by blocking the action of Na^{+}/K^{+}-ATPase transmembrane proteins. As a result, applying S. canadensis to the skin may destroy tissue and lead to the formation of a large scab called an eschar. Although applying escharotic agents, including S. canadensis, to the skin is sometimes suggested as a home treatment for skin cancer, these attempts can be severely disfiguring, as well as unsuccessful. Case reports have shown that in such instances tumors have recurred and/or metastasized. The United States Food and Drug Administration (FDA) has approved the inclusion of sanguinarine in toothpastes as an antibacterial or anti-plaque agent, although it is believed that this use may cause leukoplakia, a premalignant oral lesion. The safe level of sanguinarine in such products is subject to regulation and debate. S. canadensis extracts have also been promoted by some supplement companies as a treatment or cure for cancer, but the FDA has listed some of these products among its "187 Fake Cancer 'Cures' Consumers Should Avoid". Bloodroot is a popular red natural dye used by Native American artists, especially among rivercane basketmakers in the Southeastern United States. However, in spite of supposed curative properties and historical use by Native Americans as an emetic, due to its toxicity internal use is not advisable (sanguinarine has an LD_{50} of only 18 mg per kg body weight).	
Scopolia carniolica	European scopolia, henbane bell	Solanaceae	Its toxicity derives from its high levels of tropane alkaloids, particularly atropine. The quantity of atropine is the highest in the root.	
Solanum dulcamara	bittersweet nightshade	Solanaceae	All parts are poisonous, containing solanine and causing fatigue, paralysis, convulsions, and diarrhea. Rarely fatal.	
Solanum nigrum	black nightshade	Solanaceae	All parts of the plant except the ripe fruit contain the toxic glycoalkaloid solanine. Solanine poisoning is primarily displayed by gastrointestinal and neurological disorders. Symptoms include nausea, diarrhea, vomiting, stomach cramps, burning of the throat, cardiac dysrhythmia, headache and dizziness. In more severe cases, hallucinations, loss of sensation, paralysis, fever, jaundice, dilated pupils and hypothermia can result. In large quantities, solanine poisoning can be fatal.	
Solanum pseudocapsicum	Jerusalem cherry, Madeira winter cherry, winter cherry	Solanaceae	All parts, especially the berries, are poisonous, causing nausea and vomiting. It is occasionally fatal, especially to children.	
Strophanthus gratus		Apocynaceae	The ripe seeds of this African plant contain ouabain, a potent cardiac glycoside that, when sufficiently concentrated, can induce cardiac arrest by binding to and inhibiting the action of the sodium-potassium pump and thereby drastically slowing the contraction of cardiac muscle cells. It was once used medicinally in small doses to treat congestive heart failure and other heart conditions, but has largely been replaced by the structurally related digoxin. Extracts from Strophanthus gratus and the bark of Acokanthera species have long been used by Somali tribesmen to poison hunting arrows; if the concentration is high enough, an arrow poisoned with ouabain can kill an adult hippopotamus.	
Strychnos nux-vomica	strychnine tree	Loganiaceae	The seeds usually contain about 1.5% strychnine, an extremely bitter and deadly alkaloid. This substance throws a human into intense muscle convulsions and usually kills within three hours. The bark of the tree may also contain brucine, another dangerous chemical.	
Symplocarpus foetidus	skunk cabbage, meadow cabbage, foetid pothos, polecat weed	Araceae	The leaves and roots contain calcium oxalate crystals, which are moderately toxic to humans. Ingesting large quantities of either may produce symptoms including burning of the mouth and throat, swelling of the lips and tongue, vomiting, headaches, and dizziness; merely handling the fresh leaves can burn the skin.	
Taxus baccata	English yew, common yew, graveyard tree	Taxaceae	Nearly all parts contain toxic taxanes (except the red, fleshy, and slightly sweet aril surrounding the toxic seeds). The seeds themselves are particularly toxic if chewed. Several people have committed suicide by ingesting leaves and seeds, including Catuvolcus, king of a tribe in what is now Belgium.	
Toxicodendron spp.	Several species, including Toxicodendron radicans (commonly known as poison ivy), Toxicodendron diversilobum (commonly known as poison-oak), and Toxicodendron vernix (commonly known as poison sumac)	Anacardiaceae	All parts of these plants contain a highly irritating oil with urushiol. Skin reactions can include blisters and rashes. The oil spreads readily to clothes and back again, and can persist in the environment for a very long time. Infections can follow scratching. The smoke of burning poison ivy can cause reactions in the lungs, and can be fatal.Despite the common names, urushiol is not a poison but an allergen; i.e., the symptoms associated with it are autoimmune reactions, and because of this it will not affect certain people, though urushiol sensitivity can change over time and more exposure can also increase speed of reaction. The allergic reaction caused by contact with poison ivy affects around 50% to 80% of the human population, with as many as 350,000 cases reported annually in the United States alone.	
Urtica ferox	ongaonga	Urticaceae	Even the lightest touch can result in a painful sting that lasts several days. Though there was 2 deaths attributed to this plant, one in 1961 who died 5 hours after walking through a dense patch of this plant. The other was a young man in 2002 which was retrospectively attributed to this plant by a pathologist some 15 years later.	
Veratrum spp.	false hellebore, corn lily	Melanthiaceae	Several species, containing highly toxic steroidal alkaloids (e.g. veratridine) that activate sodium ion channels and cause rapid cardiac failure and death if ingested. All parts of the plant are poisonous, with the root and rhizomes being the most toxic. Symptoms typically occur between 30 minutes and 4 hours after ingestion and include nausea and vomiting, abdominal pain, numbness, headache, sweating, muscle weakness, bradycardia, hypotension, cardiac arrhythmia, and seizures. Treatment for poisoning includes gastrointestinal decontamination with activated charcoal followed by supportive care including fluid replacement, antiemetics for persistent nausea and vomiting, atropine for treatment of bradycardia, and vasopressors for the treatment of hypotension. Native Americans used the juice pressed from the roots to poison arrows before combat. The dried powdered root of this plant was also used as an insecticide. The plants' teratogenic properties and ability to induce severe birth defects were well known to Native Americans, although they also used minute amounts of the winter-harvested root (combined with Salvia dorii to potentiate its effects and reduce the toxicity of the herb) to treat cancerous tumors. The toxic steroidal alkaloids are produced only when the plants are in active growth, so herbalists and Native Americans who used this plant for medicinal purposes harvested the roots during the winter months when the levels of toxic constituents were at their lowest. The roots of V. nigrum and V. schindleri have been used in Chinese herbalism (where plants of this genus are known as "li lu" (藜蘆). Li lu is used internally as a powerful emetic of last resort, and topically to kill external parasites, treat tinea and scabies, and stop itching. However some herbalists refuse to prescribe li lu internally, citing the extreme difficulty in preparing a safe and effective dosage, and that death has occurred at a dosage of 0.6 grams. During the 1930s Veratrum extracts were investigated in the treatment of high blood pressure in humans. However patients often had side effects due to the narrow therapeutic index of these products. Due to its toxicity, the use of Veratrum as a treatment for high blood pressure in humans was discontinued.	
Vernicia fordii	tung tree	Euphorbiaceae	It is poisonous in all of its parts, including the fruit and the seeds, although some parts of the tree have been used for medicinal purposes in the past. According to one university website, just one seed from the fruit can be fatal, and other symptoms may include vomiting, diarrhea, and slowed breathing. The leaves can also give a rash similar to that from poison ivy.	
Viscum spp.	European mistletoe; see also the related genus Phoradendron	Santalaceae	Mistletoe is a common hemiparasite of trees and shrubs. Toxicity varies by species, but all parts of the plant, especially the leaves and berries, contain an array of toxic chemicals, including several different viscotoxins, the alkaloid tyramine, and a ribosome-inactivating lectin called viscumin. Symptoms may include acute gastrointestinal discomfort, diarrhea, weak pulse and/or slow heart rate, and even seizures; it is rarely lethal to adult humans, however, and many wild animals are adapted to eating its fruit.	
Wisteria sinensis	Chinese wisteria	Fabaceae	All parts of the plant contain a glycoside called wisterin which is toxic if ingested and may cause nausea, vomiting, stomach pains, and diarrhea. Wisterias have caused poisoning in children of many countries, producing mild to severe gastroenteritis.	
Xanthium spp.	cocklebur	Asteraceae	The common cocklebur (Xanthium strumarium), a native of North America, can be poisonous to livestock, including horses, cattle, and sheep. Some domestic animals will avoid consuming the plant if other forage is present, but less discriminating animals, such as pigs, will consume the plants and then sicken and die. The seedlings and seeds are the most toxic parts of the plants. Symptoms usually occur within a few hours, producing unsteadiness and weakness, depression, nausea and vomiting, twisting of the neck muscles, rapid and weak pulse, difficulty breathing, and eventually death. Xanthium has also been used for its medicinal properties and for making yellow dye, as indicated by its name (Greek xanthos = 'yellow').	
Zantedeschia aethiopica	calla lily, arum lily	Araceae	All parts of the plant are toxic, containing calcium oxalate, which induces irritation and swelling of the mouth and throat, acute vomiting and diarrhea. Can be fatal.	
Zigadenus glaberrimus	sandbog death camas	Melanthiaceae	All parts of Z. glaberrimus are toxic, due to the presence of alkaloids. This or related species have caused human fatalities.	

== See also ==
- Plant defense against herbivory
- List of plants poisonous to equines
- List of psychoactive plants
- List of poisonous fungus species
- List of venomous animals
- Biopesticide
- Mushroom poisoning
- Poison garden
- Secondary metabolite
- Toxin
- Weed

== Bibliography ==
- Wink, M (2009). "Mode of action and toxicology of plant toxins and poisonous plants". Mitt. Julius Kühn-Inst. 421: 93–112. Archived from the original on 18 March 2014.
