= Konzo =

Disease due to malnutrition and high dietary cyanide intake

- A drawing of a boy affected by konzo displaying the typical gait. The upper motor neurons are damaged by acetone cyanohydrin.
- Specialty: Neurology

Konzo is an epidemic paralytic disease occurring among hunger-stricken rural populations in Africa where a diet dominated by insufficiently processed cassava results in simultaneous malnutrition and high dietary acetone cyanohydrin intake. Konzo was first described by Giovanni Trolli in 1938; he compiled the observations from eight doctors working in the Kwango area of the Belgian Congo (now the Democratic Republic of the Congo).

== Signs and symptoms ==
The onset of paralysis (spastic paraparesis) is sudden, symmetrical, and affects the legs more than the arms. The resulting disability is permanent, but does not progress. Typically, a patient is standing and walking on the balls of the feet with rigid legs and often with ankle clonus.

Initially, most patients experience generalized weakness during the first days and are bedridden for some days or weeks before trying to walk. Occasional blurred vision and/or speech difficulties typically clear during the first month, except in severely affected patients. Spasticity is present from the first day, without any initial phase of flaccidity. After the initial weeks of functional improvement, the spastic paraparesis remains stable for the rest of the patient's life. Some patients may experience an abrupt aggravating episode, e.g. a sudden and permanent worsening of the spastic paraparesis. Such episodes are identical to the initial onset, so can be interpreted as a second onset.

The severity of konzo varies; cases range from only hyperreflexia in the lower limbs to a severely disabled patient with spastic paraparesis, associated weakness of the trunk and arms, impaired speech and eye movement, with possible visual impairment. Although the severity varies from patient to patient, the longest upper motor neurons are invariably more affected than the shorter ones. Thus, a konzo patient with speech impairment always shows severe symptoms in the legs and arms.

Recently, neuropsychological effects of konzo have been described from the Democratic Republic of the Congo (DRC).

== Cause ==
While the exact mechanisms are unclear, disease onset is associated with high intake of cyanide from a diet of mostly bitter cassava, which is also low in antioxidants such as sulfur amino acids. These are essential for the detoxification process in the body of cyanide to thiocyanate, which is removed in the urine. A number of studies implicate the combination of high cyanide intake from bitter cassava and low intake of sulfur amino acids as the cause. The month-by-month incidence of konzo in children has been shown to be significantly correlated with high urinary thiocyanate content, which is a measure of their cyanide intake. The importance of an adequate supply of protein sulfur amino acids is shown from three unrelated konzo epidemics in Mozambique, Tanzania, and the DRC. People of the same ethnic group, living only 5 km away from those with konzo, were found to have near zero konzo prevalence. Some suspect this is due to diet; in Mozambique and Tanzania, healthier populations lived near rivers and lakes, providing fish; in the DRC, they were adjacent to the forest and had access to bushmeat.

The dose–response relationship between konzo incidence and cyanide intake, together with the prevention of konzo in many villages by reducing cyanide intake from cassava (see below), and the importance of sulfur amino acids in prevention of konzo, show that konzo is very likely due to high cyanide/low sulfur amino acid intake in a diet of bitter cassava. Konzo does not occur unless these conditions are met, which occurs only in remote villages in six tropical African countries. The total number of reported cases up to 2009 was 6788, but most cases are never reported and an estimated 100,000 cases occurred in the DRC alone in 2002. Konzo is spreading geographically, as cassava is being grown in new areas where knowledge of processing methods to remove toxins is minimal. Konzo epidemics occur due to war, which causes disruption of life in poor villages and drought, when the plant increases the cyanogen content of roots two to four times and the cyanide content of cassava flour also increases greatly. Konzo is also endemic in certain areas.

In East Africa, the traditional methods of processing cassava consist of sun drying and heap fermentation, which provide inconsistent toxin removal even in a year of normal rainfall. In Central Africa, the retting of cassava roots in water for 4–5 days is adequate, but attempting to shorten the process may cause konzo. In West Africa, a roasted product called garri is produced by a different method from that used to produce flour, which reduces the total cyanide content to a tolerable 10–20 ppm. No cases of konzo are reported west of Cameroon, but another neurological disease called tropical ataxic neuropathy (TAN) occurs amongst older people in West Africa (including south-west Nigeria, Tanzania, Uganda, Kenya, and also in the West Indies and South India). It is probably due to long-term intake of acetone cyanohydrin from cassava at a lower level than that needed to cause konzo.

== Diagnosis ==
The WHO has recommended three criteria for the diagnosis of konzo:

- Visible symmetric spastic abnormality of gait while walking or running
- A history of onset of less than one week followed by a nonprogressive course in a formerly healthy person
- Bilaterally exaggerated knee or ankle jerk reflexes without signs of disease of the spine

Depending on its severity, konzo is divided into three categories - mild when individuals are able to walk without support, moderate when individuals need one or two sticks to walk, and severe when the affected person is unable to walk unsupported.

=== Differential diagnosis ===
The clinical symptoms are strikingly similar to those of neurolathyrism. They are also similar to those of viral tropical spastic paraparesis and hereditary spastic paraparesis, but those two disorders have a slow onset. Konzo is clinically distinct from viral diseases like polio, which is a flaccid paralysis and most often affects a person asymmetrically.

Konzo is one of several tropical neuropathies. A distinct neuropathy also associated with cassava is TAN, as first described in parts of Nigeria by B. O. Osuntokun in 1968. The disease is still occurring in the same areas.

== Prevention ==
Konzo can be prevented by use of the "wetting method", which is used to remove residual cyanogens from cassava flour, as an additional processing method. Cassava flour is placed in a bowl and the level marked on the inside of the bowl. Water is added with mixing until the height of the wet flour comes up to the mark. The wet flour is placed in a thin layer on a mat for 2 hours in the sun or 5 hours in the shade to allow the escape of hydrogen cyanide produced by the breakdown of linamarin by the enzyme linamarase. The damp flour is then cooked in boiling water in the traditional way to produce a breakfast porridge called "fufu" or "ugali". The wetting method is generally accepted by rural women because it requires little extra work or equipment and produces food that tastes better, because the bitter-tasting linamarin has been removed.

In 2010, the wetting method was taught to the women in Kay Kalenge village, Popokabaka Health Zone, Bandundu Province, DRC, which had 34 konzo cases. The women used the method and during the intervention, no new konzo cases happened and the urinary thiocyanate content of the school children fell to safe levels. Konzo had been prevented for the first time in the same health zone in which it had first been discovered by Dr Trolli in 1938. Fourteen months after the intervention ceased, the village was visited again, and no new cases of konzo were found, the school children had low urinary thiocyanate levels, the wetting method was still being used, and it had spread by word of mouth to three nearby villages. Teaching the women that konzo is due to a poison present in their food is important, to get them to use use the wetting method regularly, and posters are available in 13 different languages as a teaching aid for an additional method to remove residual cyanogens.

The wetting method has now been used in 13 villages in the DRC with a collective population of nearly 10,000 people. The time of the intervention has been reduced from 18 months in the first intervention, to 12 months in the second intervention, to 9 months in the third and fourth interventions. This has reduced the cost per person of the intervention to prevent konzo to $16 per person. This targeted method to reduce cyanide intake is much cheaper and more effective in preventing konzo than broad-based interventions.

== Prognosis ==
No treatment has been found, but affected individuals benefit considerably from rehabilitation and use of adequate walking aids. In the Central African Republic, some children have been treated surgically with an elongation of the Achilles tendon, which improved the position of the foot, but the long-term consequence remains uncertain.

== Epidemiology ==
Konzo has been reported in outbreaks mainly among women and children in remote rural populations in the DRC, Mozambique (where it is known as mantakassa), Tanzania, Central African Republic, Cameroon and Angola.

The first reported outbreak occurred in Bandundu Province in present-day DRC in 1936–1937 and the second in Nampula Province of northern Mozambique in 1981. Each of these outbreaks numbered more than 1000 cases. Familial clustering is common. Outbreaks typically occur in the dry season in households living in absolute poverty that have sustained themselves for weeks or months on insufficiently processed bitter cassava. Both smaller outbreaks and sporadic cases have been reported from all the countries above.

== Etymology ==
The word konzo means "tied legs" in the Yaka language of southwestern DRC and was the designation by the first affected population in the DRC as reported by Dr G. Trolli in 1938. The name, taken up by Hans Rosling and colleagues, aptly describes the typical abnormal gait of those affected.

== See also ==
- Lathyrism
