= Isoleucine N-monooxygenase =

Class of enzymes

Identifiers
- EC no.: 1.14.14.39

Databases
- BRENDA: enzyme data
- ExPASy: NiceZyme view
- KEGG: enzyme entry
- MetaCyc: metabolic pathway
- Rhea: reactions
- PDB structures: RCSB PDB PDBe PDBsum
Search
- PMC: articles
- PubMed: articles
- NCBI: proteins

Isoleucine N-monooxygenase (EC 1.14.14.39, CYP79D3, CYP79D4) is an enzyme with systematic name L-isoleucine,NADPH:oxygen oxidoreductase (N-hydroxylating). It catalyses the following sequence of chemical reactions:

isoleucine
+ 2 NADPH + 2 H^{+}
2 O_{2}
2 H_{2}O
N,N-dihydroxy-L-isoleucine
+ 2 NADP^{+}
CO_{2} + H_{2}O
(1E,2S)-2-methylbutanal oxime

The enzyme uses molecular oxygen and reduced nicotinamide adenine dinucleotide phosphate (NADPH) to convert L-isoleucine first to its N-hydroxy derivative and then to N,N-dihydroxy-L-isoleucine. This compound is unstable and loses carbon dioxide and water to give the (1E,2S) isomer of 2-methylbutanal oxime.

Isoleucine N-monooxygenase is a cytochrome P450 protein containing heme. The product oxime is an intermediate in the biosynthesis of lotaustralin in Lotus japonicus.
