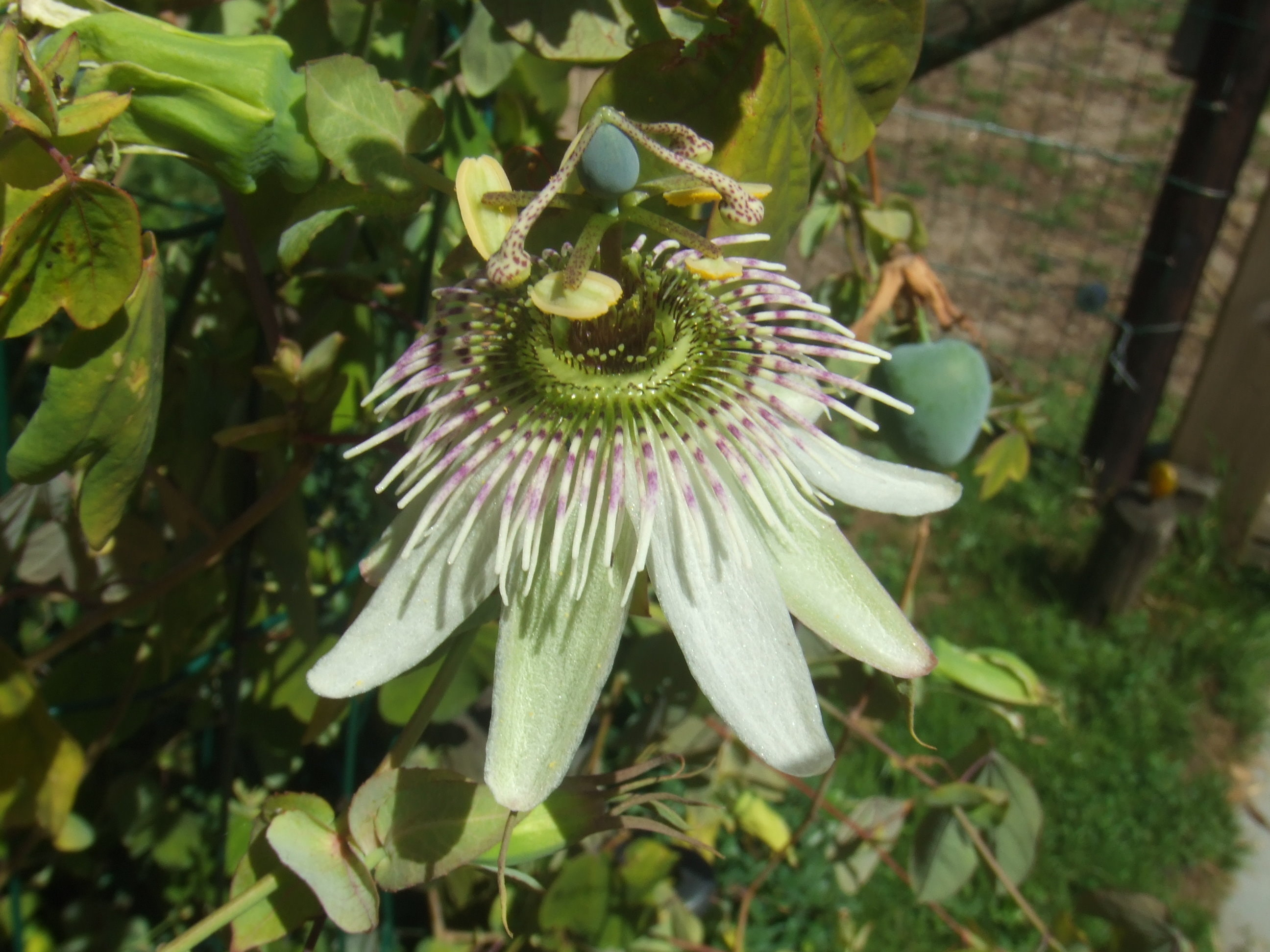
- P.gibertii fruits and flower

Scientific classification
- Kingdom: Plantae
- Clade: Tracheophytes
- Clade: Angiosperms
- Clade: Eudicots
- Clade: Rosids
- Order: Malpighiales
- Family: Passifloraceae
- Genus: Passiflora
- Species: P. gibertii

Binomial name
- Passiflora gibertii N.E.Br.

= Passiflora gibertii =

Species of vine

Passiflora gibertii is a fast-growing ornamental vine with edible fruits. The flowers are also ornamental. The fast-growing vine can grow up to 8.2 m (27 ft) long. It has three-lobed (occasionally 5-lobed) leaves which can grow to a few inches long. Vines may trail across arbors or climb trees or fences. The plant is easily container-grown and will flower readily. Flowering generally occurs in warm months. Some fruits may follow, and the ripe fruits which are yellow to orange in color are edible, though some reports claim the unripe fruits are poisonous. Its hardiness is to about 0 °C (32 °F). It grows in full sun or in part shade. The vines need regular water, especially during the growing season. Vines can be pruned if needed, as secondary shoots readily sprout. Seeds benefit from presoaking and require warm temperatures of 24–29 °C (75–85 °F) for germination. Germination time is erratic and often takes several weeks to a few months. P. gibertii is not as commonly planted as some of the other Passifloras. It is native to South America, from Argentina through Paraguay and Brazil.
