= Tropical neuropathy =

Tropical neuropathy is a class of illnesses with similar signs and symptoms, including konzo, tropical spastic paraparesis (TSP), and tropical ataxic neuropathy (TAN). TAN is poorly understood, and some researchers subdivide it further into separate illnesses.
