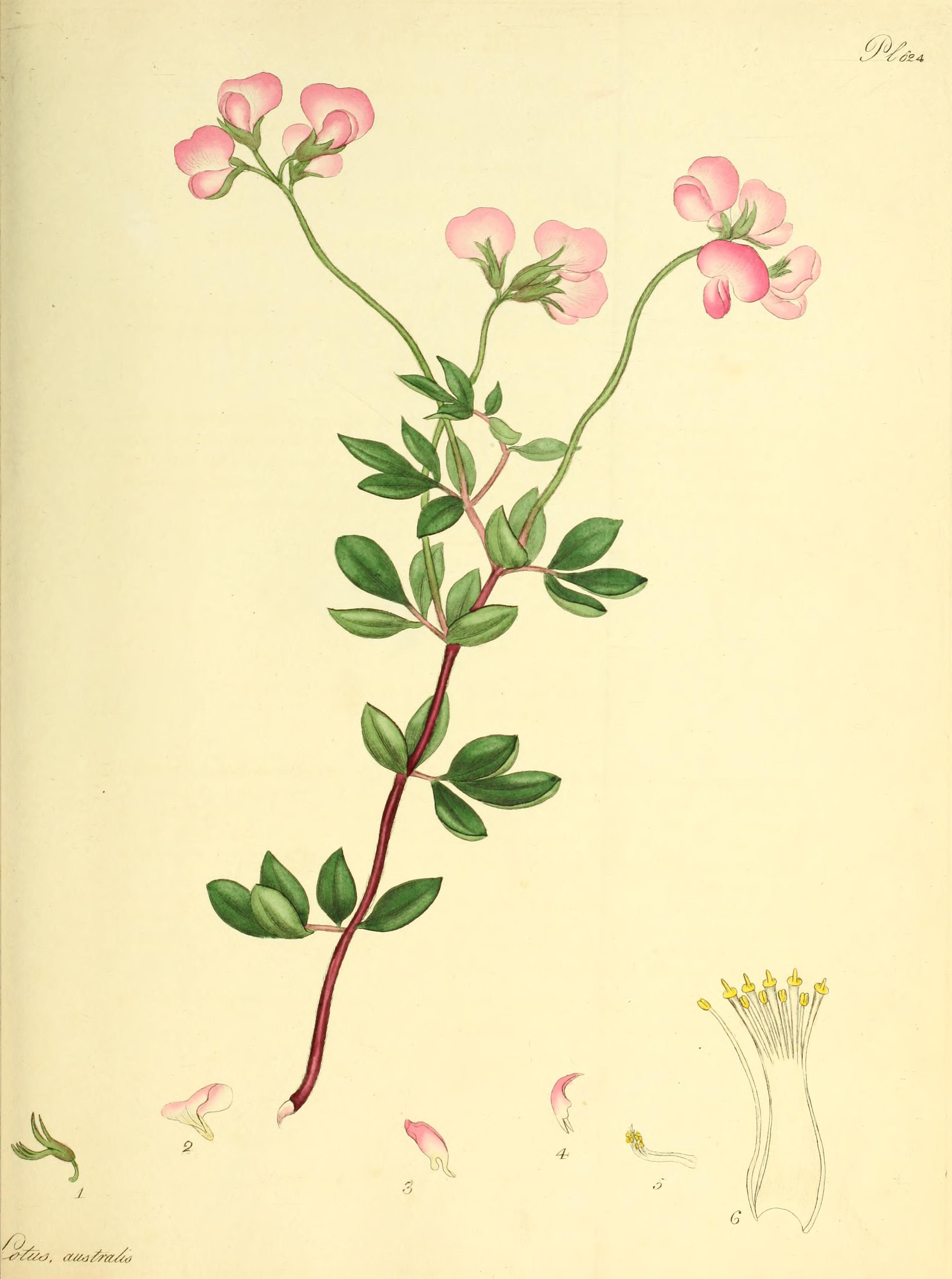
- Illustration by Henry Cranke Andrews

Scientific classification
- Kingdom: Plantae
- Clade: Tracheophytes
- Clade: Angiosperms
- Clade: Eudicots
- Clade: Rosids
- Order: Fabales
- Family: Fabaceae
- Subfamily: Faboideae
- Genus: Lotus
- Species: L. australis

Binomial name
- Lotus australis Andrews
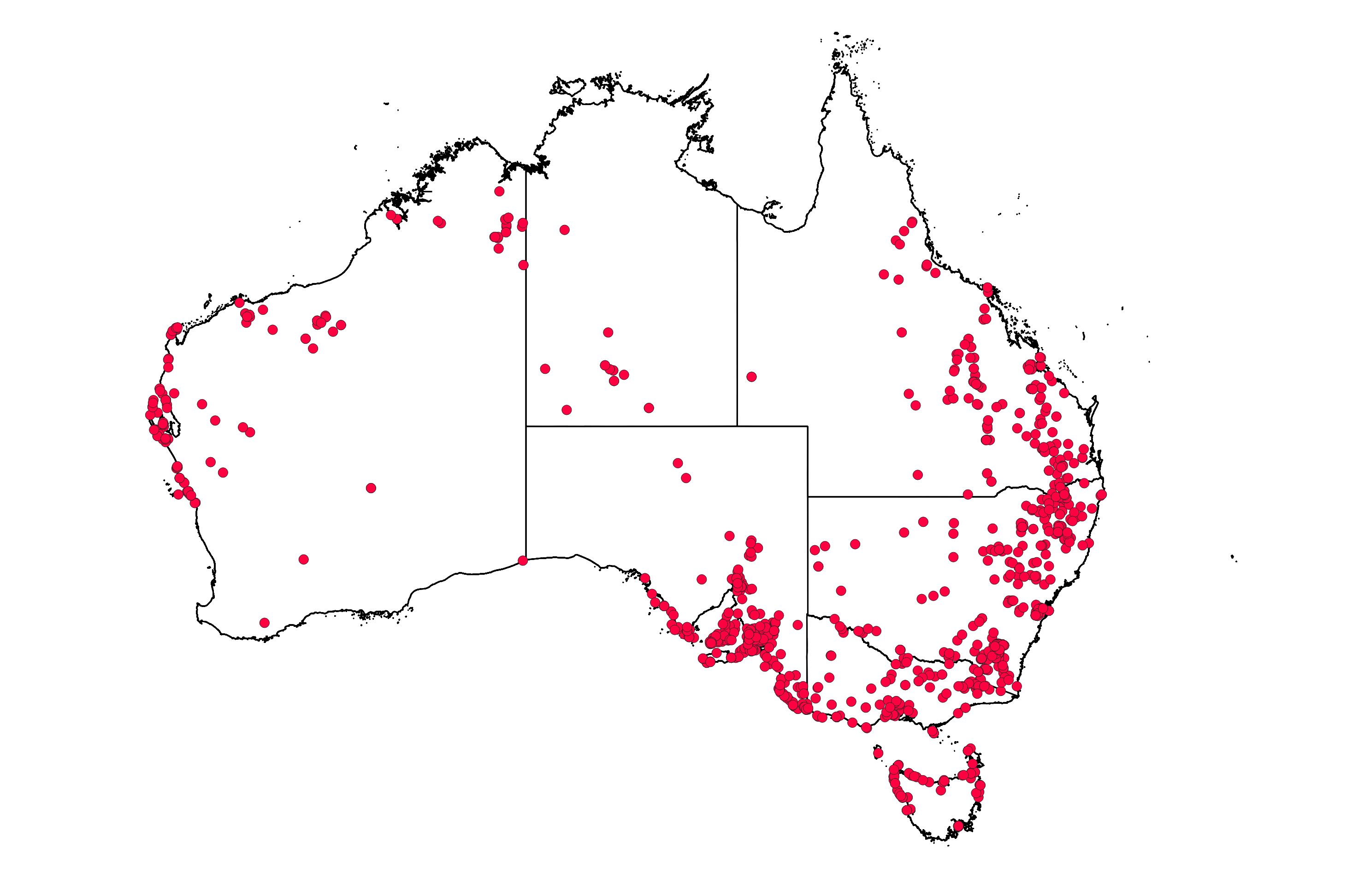
- Occurrence data from AVH

= Lotus australis =

Species of legume

Lotus australis, known by its common name of austral trefoil, is a small, spreading herb from the family Fabaceae. It normally grows to around 30–50 cm in height and is native to Australia.

Leaves are of a trifoliate shape and are small, with a light green colour. During spring, the plant bursts into beautiful massed displays of white pea flowers. In summer, these are replaced with stiff, tubular beans, which explode when they dry, releasing multiple small, black legume seeds. Austral trefoil is easily propagated from these seeds, by soaking the seeds in hot water overnight before sowing. This mimics the heat of a bushfire, which is a contributing factor in germination in the wild.

Lotus australis is one of just a few plants in which the cyanogenic glucoside known as lotaustralin naturally occurs.

== Gallery ==
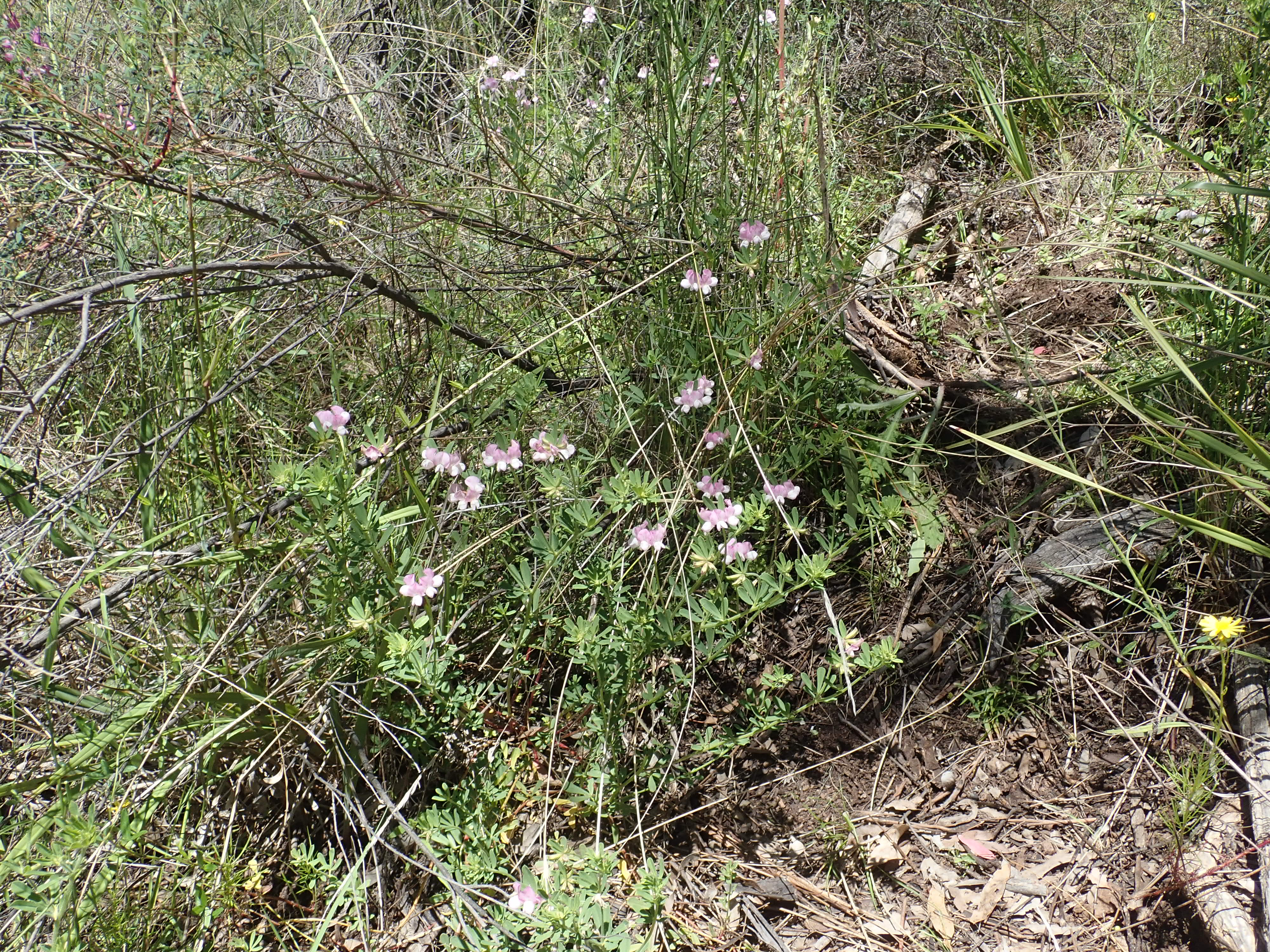
Habitat

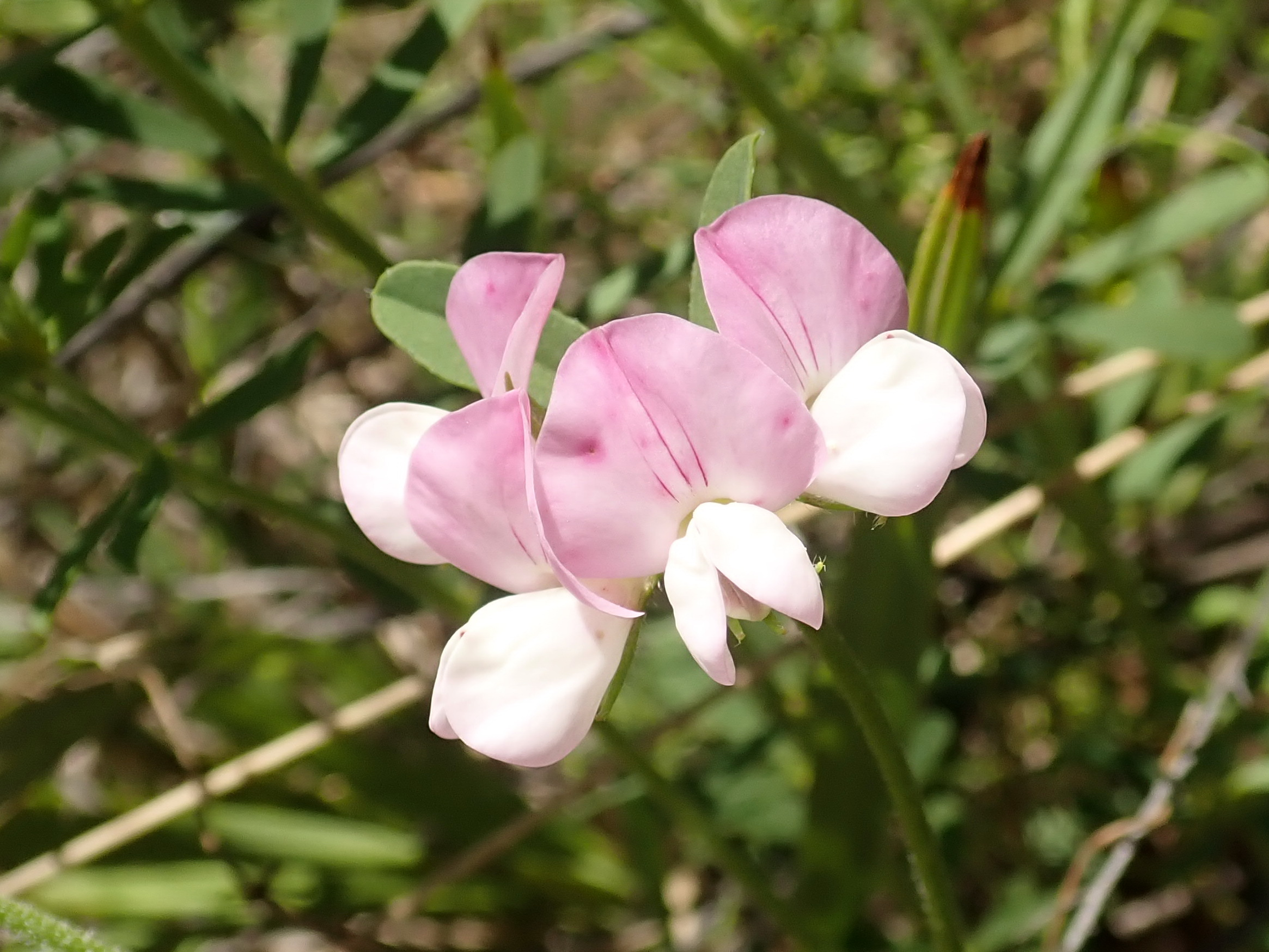
Inflorescence
