= Tropical ataxic neuropathy =

Neurological disorder

- Other names: Strachan-Scott syndrome and prisoners of war neuropathy
- Specialty: Neurology

Tropical ataxic neuropathy (TAN, also known as Strachan-Scott syndrome and prisoners of war neuropathy) is a disease or category of diseases that commonly causes disability and increases mortality. The causes of TAN are not understood; there is no generally accepted treatment, and the reported outcomes are inconsistent.

The disease affects poor tropical populations; there are no good statistics on how many people are affected worldwide, but in some populations, more than a quarter of people are affected. Malnutrition may play a role.

TAN is one of many tropical myeloneuropathies. It was first described in Jamaica in 1897, by postmortems of 510 cases; in 1959, it was dubbed "tropical ataxic neuropathy".

== Epidemiology ==
TAN has only been described as developing in Africa, South-east Asia, and the Caribbean (if Guiana be included). It does not seem to occur in temperate countries. People affected by TAN tend to be poor and live in rural areas. In some areas, more than a quarter of the population is affected. In India and Africa, more women are affected; in Africa, the elderly are most likely to suffer, and in India, people in their thirties. Historical data suggest that, in the 1960s, TAN in Africa was most common in people in their 30s and 40s.

While the areas affected roughly correspond to the areas in which cassava is grown, some people in non-cassava-growing populations get TAN, and some cassava-growing populations do not get TAN. It is possible that there are several diseases being categorized as TAN.

It has been estimated that 5% of surviving World War II prisoners of war held in the Far East acquired TAN; while they were held for 3.5 years or less, the TAN symptoms persisted chronically after they returned to temperate climates.

== Causes and symptoms ==
The causes of TAN are unclear; there may be several separate causes of similar symptoms.

There are thought to be two neurological syndromes lumped together as TAN. One affects adolescents, appears with retrobulbar optic neuropathy and evidence of malnutrition, and improves with better nutrition. Half of these adolescents are seen to have spinal ataxia.

The other affects middle-aged and elderly people. They suffer sensory polyneuropathy, including weakness and paresthesic sensations. Paresthesias include sensations of numbness, heat, cold, tightness, crawling motion, tingling, pins and needles, and a feeling of walking on cotton or pebbles. Weaknesses show as gait ataxia (lack of co-ordination). Affected people also suffer optic atrophy and sensory neural deafness, on both sides of the body. There is neurological damage to the pyramidal tract of the spinal cord. For these older patients, evidence of malnutrition is rarer, and improving nutrition does not improve symptoms.

Most of those with the older-onset form have symptoms in their legs, but a third to a half also have arm symptoms. Symptoms tend to worsen during the rainy season (see monsoon, harmattan), and are often worse at night. Symptoms associated with the lower cranial nerve are rarer; most patients do not show them. These symptoms include dysarthria (difficulty articulating words), dysphagia (difficulty swallowing), shortness of breath, and dysphonia (difficulty speaking); dysphonia is more common in women, and shows as hypophonia (lack of co-ordination in the vocal cords) and an inability to shout.

== Diagnosis ==
The diagnostic criteria were defined in 1968. TAN is defined by "bilateral optic atrophy, bilateral sensory neural deafness, predominant posterior column involvement, and pyramidal tract myelopathy, with ataxic polyneuropathy". The classification of TAN is still not settled, and researchers disagree about it.

== Treatment ==
Nutritional improvements; supplying nutritional yeast, teaching improved cassava preparation, and ceasing cassava consumption.

== Outlook ==
Unclear, with contradictory reports from different studies.

== Research directions ==
A 2016 review listed twenty-one open research questions. The value of international co-operation on TAN research has also been highlighted.

== Other animals ==
The behaviour and neurology of malnourished and cassava-fed rats has been compared to that of humans with TAN.

== See also ==
- Konzo, a diet-based tropical neuropathy
- Lathyrism, a diet-based neuropathy
- Tropical spastic paraparesis, and infectious tropical myeloneuropathy
- Neglected tropical diseases
- Beri-beri
