= Tropical spastic paraparesis =

- Other names: HTLV-I-associated myelopathy (HAM) or HTLV-I-associated myelopathy/tropical spastic paraparesis (HAM/TSP)
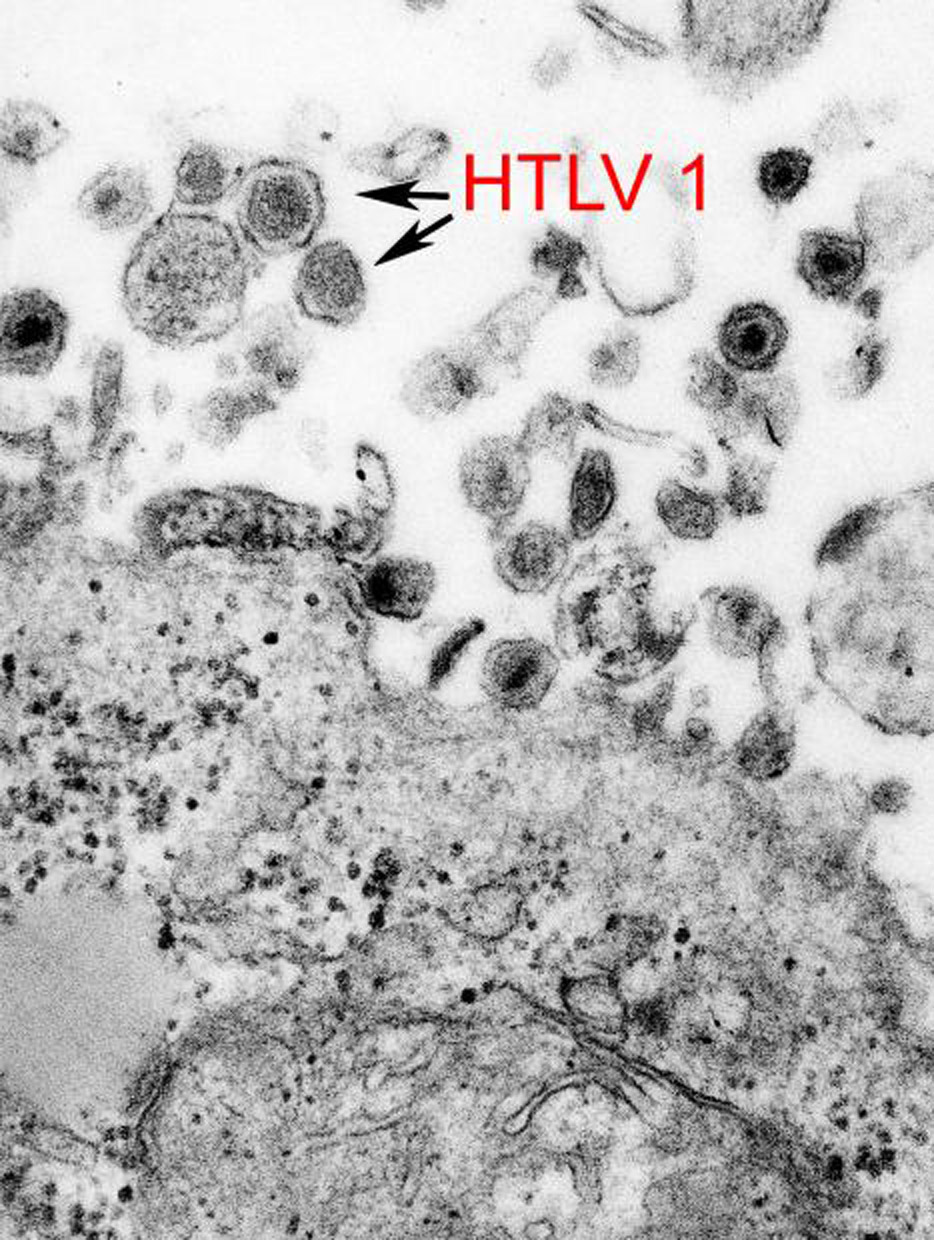
- HTLV-1 which causes TSP
- Specialty: Neurology
- Symptoms: Bowel dysfunction
- Causes: HTLV-1 retrovirus causes 80% of cases
- Diagnostic method: Lumbar puncture, MRI
- Treatment: Interferon alpha, corticosteroids

Tropical spastic paraparesis (TSP) is a medical condition that causes weakness, muscle spasms, and sensory disturbance by human T-lymphotropic virus resulting in paraparesis, weakness of the legs. As the name suggests, it is most common in tropical regions, including the Caribbean. Blood transfusion products are screened for human T-lymphotropic virus 1 (HTLV-1) antibodies, as a preventive measure.

== Signs and symptoms ==
Traditional signs that were first found of Tropical spastic paraparesis are:

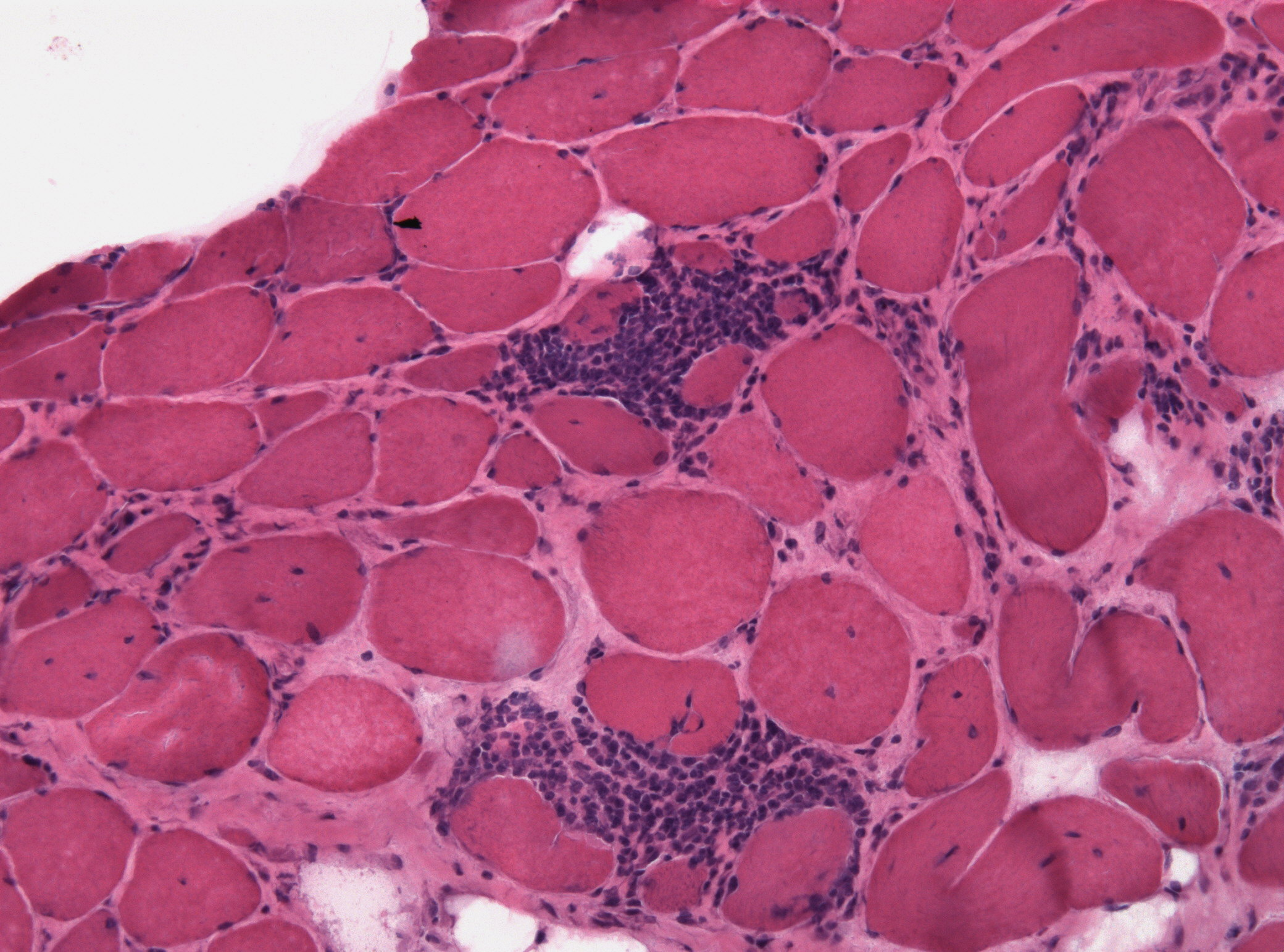
Polymyositis

- Leg instability
- Urinary dysfunction.
- Bowel dysfunction
- Back pain
- Erectile problems
- Psoriasis

Since 2006, nonetheless, the concept of "HTLV-1 neurological complex" has been proposed to include many more symptoms that were previously unknown, such as Cognitive impairment, Myopathy, Polyneuropathy, Dysautonomia and ALS-like symptoms.

Individuals with TSP may also exhibit uveitis (inflammation of the uveal tract of the eye), arthritis (inflammation of one or more joints), pulmonary lymphocytic alveolitis (inflammation of the lung tissues), polymyositis (an inflammatory muscle disease), keratoconjunctivitis sicca (persistent dryness of the cornea and conjunctiva), and infectious dermatitis (inflammation of the skin).

HTLV-1 can be transmitted via breastfeeding (mother to child), sexual contact, via blood contact (transfusion or needle sharing).

== Pathogenesis ==
In tropical spastic paraparesis, HTLV-1 shows elevated cellular acquired immune response as well as high production of proinflammatory cytokines. Interferon overexpression has been demonstrated as well. Also the number of NK cells (CD56+ and CD16+) is diminished.

== Diagnosis ==
Among the methods of diagnosing tropical spastic paraparesis are MRI (magnetic resonance imaging) and lumbar puncture (which may show lymphocytosis).

Often, the diagnosis process is based on symptoms and one's risk of exposure to the virus. A spinal tap or lumbar puncture may be used to obtain blood and CSF samples which can then be tested for parts of the virus or antibodies produced to combat the virus. MRI may be performed on the brain and spinal cord to check for abnormalities such as spinal cord degeneration and other potential causes of symptoms.

== Treatment ==
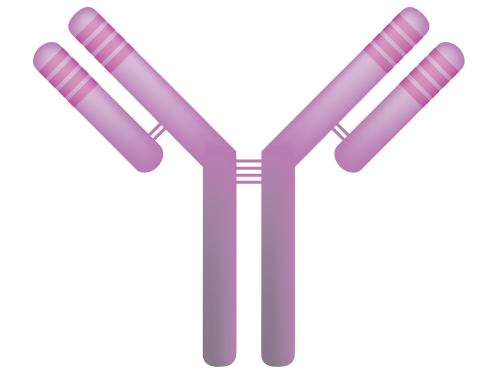
Immunoglobulin

Treatment of TSP involves corticosteroids to help with inflammation. However, any success with corticosteroids is short-lived, with symptoms worsening as the dosage is reduced. A synthetic derivative, 17-alpha-ethinyltestosterone, can be used to treat tropical spastic paraparesis, improvement in motor and bladder function was reported but not sustainable.

Mogamulizumab, an anti-CCR4 IgG1 monoclonal antibody, is also being researched as a possible treatment for tropical spastic paraparesis. The antibody reduces HTLV-1 proviral load and production of proinflammatory cytokines. Valproic acid has also succeeded in reducing the proviral load of HTLV-1 (though clinical benefits were minimal or none). A further combination of valproic acid and zidovudine has demonstrated a decrease in proviral loads (in animals).

== Prognosis ==
The prognosis for tropical spastic paraparesis indicates some improvement in a percentage of cases due to immunosuppressive treatment. A higher percentage will eventually lose the ability to walk within a ten-year interval.

== History ==
For several decades, the term tropical spastic paraparesis was used to describe a chronic and progressive clinical syndrome that affected adults living in equatorial areas of the world. This condition was initially thought to be associated with infectious agents (such as Treponema pertenue and Treponema pallidum, which cause inflammation of the central nervous system) and with chronic nutritional deficiencies (such as avitaminosis) or exposure to potentially toxic foods (such as bitter cassava).

Tropical myeloneuropathies are classified as two separate syndromes: tropical ataxic neuropathy (TAN) and tropical spastic paraparesis (TSP). They are placed together because they are found in tropical countries, although tropical spastic paraparesis has occurred in temperate countries (e.g., Japan).

== See also ==
- Treponema pallidum
- Myelopathy
- Lymphatic system
- Neuropathy
