= Lotaustralin =

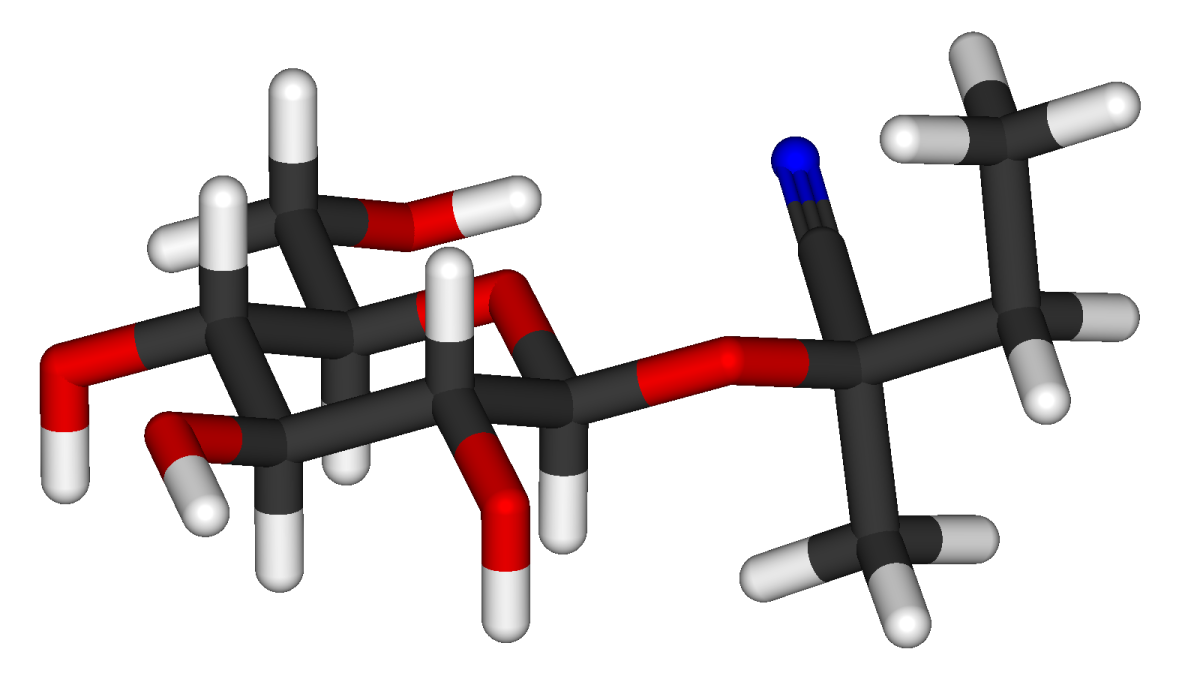

Names
- IUPAC name (2R)-2-(β-D-Glucopyranosyloxy)-2-methylbutanenitrile
- Systematic IUPAC name (2R)-2-Methyl-2-{[(2S,3R,4S,5S,6R)-3,4,5-trihydroxy-6-(hydroxymethyl)oxan-2-yl]oxy}butanenitrile

Identifiers
| CAS Number | 534-67-8 |
| 3D model (JSmol) | Interactive image |
| ChemSpider | 390193 |
| PubChem CID | 441467 |
| UNII | P588137A94 |
| CompTox Dashboard (EPA) | DTXSID30897501 |
- InChI: InChI=1S/C11H19NO6/c1-3-11(2,5-12)18-10-9(16)8(15)7(14)6(4-13)17-10/h6-10,13-16H,3-4H2,1-2H3/t6-,7-,8+,9-,10+,11-/m1/s1 Key: WEWBWVMTOYUPHH-QHAQEBJBSA-N; InChI=1/C11H19NO6/c1-3-11(2,5-12)18-10-9(16)8(15)7(14)6(4-13)17-10/h6-10,13-16H,3-4H2,1-2H3/t6-,7-,8+,9-,10+,11-/m1/s1 Key: WEWBWVMTOYUPHH-QHAQEBJBBY
- SMILES: CC[C@](C)(C#N)O[C@H]1[C@@H]([C@H]([C@@H]([C@H](O1)CO)O)O)O

Properties
| Chemical formula | C_{11}H_{19}NO_{6} |
| Molar mass | 261.27 g/mol |
| Appearance | colorless needles |
| Density | 1.36 g·cm^{−3} |
| Melting point | 139 °C (282 °F; 412 K) |
| Solubility in water | good, also good in Ethyl acetate |
- Except where otherwise noted, data are given for materials in their standard state (at 25 °C [77 °F], 100 kPa). verify (what is ?) Infobox references

Lotaustralin is a cyanogenic glucoside found in small amounts in the plants austral trefoil (Lotus australis), cassava (Manihot esculenta), lima bean (Phaseolus lunatus), roseroot (Rhodiola rosea) and white clover (Trifolium repens), among other plants. Lotaustralin is the glucoside of methyl ethyl ketone cyanohydrin and is structurally related to linamarin, the acetone cyanohydrin glucoside also found in these plants. Both lotaustralin and linamarin may be hydrolyzed by the enzyme linamarase to form glucose and a precursor to the toxic compound hydrogen cyanide.
