= Linamarase =

Class of enzymes

Linamarase, or beta-D-glucosidase (EC 3.2.1.21), is an enzyme found in many plants including cassava and the butter bean.

In cassava it is found in the cell walls. When the plant is chewed or ground, it exposes the enzyme to compounds like linamarin and lotaustralin which release cyanide compounds that can be lethal to the eater. In humans, serious illness is more likely than death.

This action of the enzyme is used by many cultures to process cassava into an edible substance. The enzyme converts the cyanide containing compounds into acetone cyanohydrin, which spontaneously decomposes to hydrogen cyanide (HCN). The HCN then either dissolves readily in water or is released into the air. Not all cyanide can be removed during processing.

Linamarase is pH sensitive and can be inhibited by organic acids.
