= Linamarin =

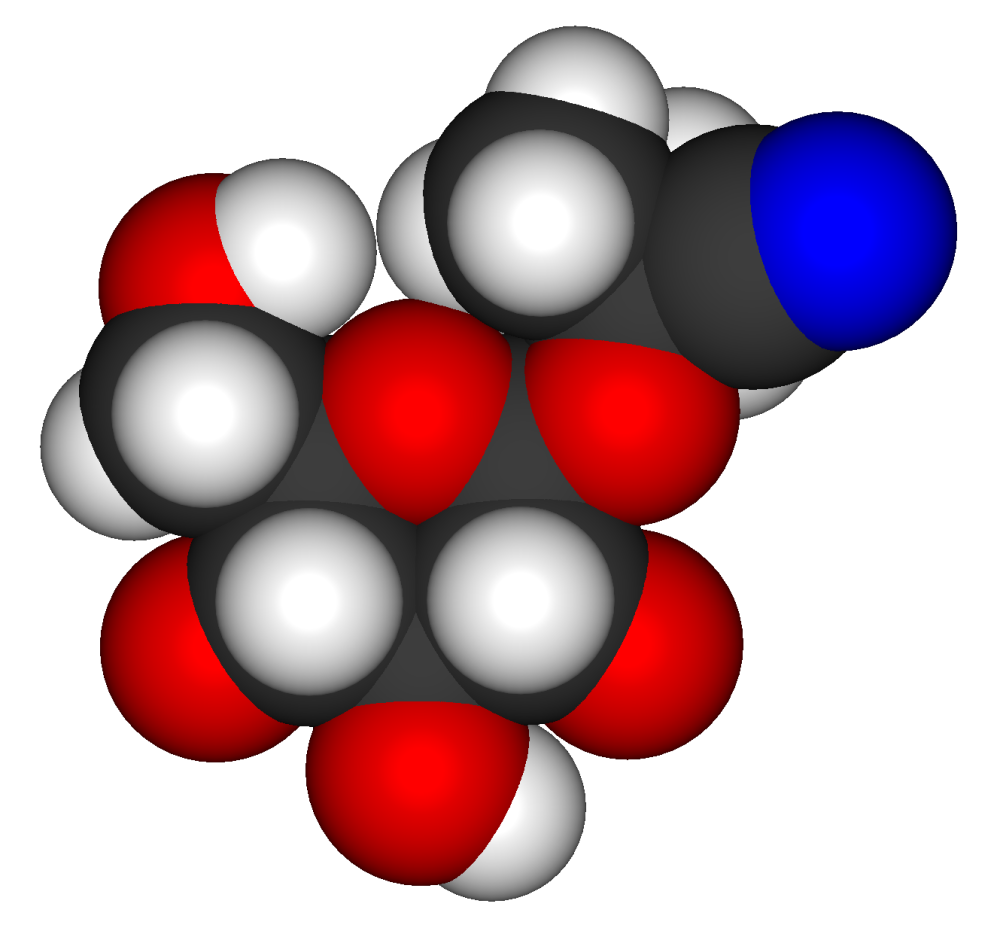

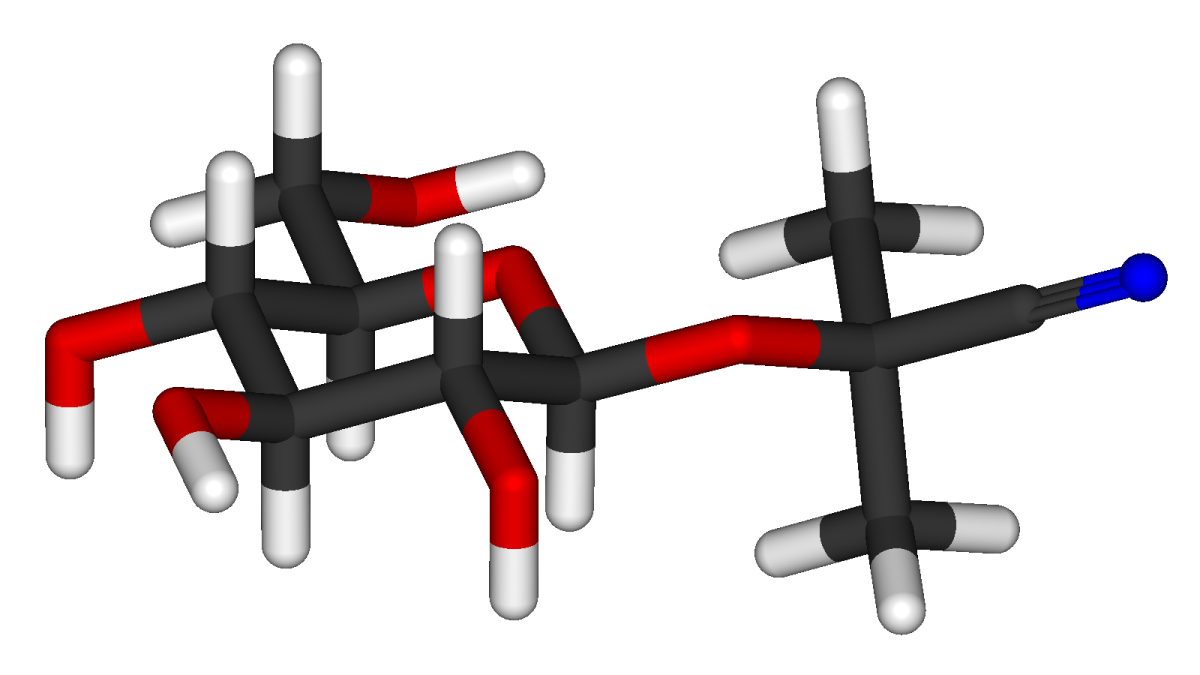

Names
- IUPAC name 2-(β-D-Glucopyranosyloxy)-2-methylpropanenitrile
- Systematic IUPAC name 2-Methyl-2-{[(2S,3R,4S,5S,6R)-3,4,5-trihydroxy-6-(hydroxymethyl)oxan-2-yl]oxy}propanenitrile
- Other names Phaseolunatin

Identifiers
CAS Number	554-35-8
3D model (JSmol)	Interactive image
ChEBI	CHEBI:16441
ChEMBL	ChEMBL3039425
ChemSpider	10657
ECHA InfoCard	100.164.971
KEGG	C01594
PubChem CID	11128
UNII	H3V9RP3WLO
CompTox Dashboard (EPA)	DTXSID8052857
- InChI: InChI=1S/C10H17NO6/c1-10(2,4-11)17-9-8(15)7(14)6(13)5(3-12)16-9/h5-9,12-15H,3H2,1-2H3/t5-,6-,7+,8-,9+/m1/s1 Key: QLTCHMYAEJEXBT-ZEBDFXRSSA-N; InChI=1/C10H17NO6/c1-10(2,4-11)17-9-8(15)7(14)6(13)5(3-12)16-9/h5-9,12-15H,3H2,1-2H3/t5-,6-,7+,8-,9+/m1/s1 Key: QLTCHMYAEJEXBT-ZEBDFXRSBH
- SMILES: CC(C)(C#N)O[C@H]1[C@@H]([C@H]([C@@H]([C@H](O1)CO)O)O)O

Properties
Chemical formula	C_{10}H_{17}NO_{6}
Molar mass	247.248 g/mol
Appearance	colorless needles
Density	1.41 g·cm^{−3}
Melting point	143 to 144 °C (289 to 291 °F; 416 to 417 K)
Solubility in water	good
- Except where otherwise noted, data are given for materials in their standard state (at 25 °C [77 °F], 100 kPa). verify (what is ?) Infobox references

Linamarin is a cyanogenic glucoside found in the leaves and roots of plants such as cassava, lima beans, and flax. It is a glucoside of acetone cyanohydrin. Upon exposure to enzymes and gut flora in the human intestine, linamarin and its methylated relative lotaustralin can decompose to the toxic chemical hydrogen cyanide; hence food uses of plants that contain significant quantities of linamarin require extensive preparation and detoxification. Ingested and absorbed linamarin is rapidly excreted in the urine and the glucoside itself does not appear to be acutely toxic. Consumption of cassava products with low levels of linamarin is widespread in the low-land tropics. Ingestion of food prepared from insufficiently processed cassava roots with high linamarin levels has been associated with dietary toxicity, particularly with the upper motor neuron disease known as konzo to the African populations in which it was first described by Trolli and later through the research network initiated by Hans Rosling. However, the toxicity is believed to be induced by ingestion of acetone cyanohydrin, the breakdown product of linamarin. Dietary exposure to linamarin has also been reported as a risk factor in developing glucose intolerance and diabetes, although studies in experimental animals have been inconsistent in reproducing this effect and may indicate that the primary effect is in aggravating existing conditions rather than inducing diabetes on its own.

The generation of cyanide from linamarin is usually enzymatic and occurs when linamarin is exposed to linamarase, an enzyme normally expressed in the cell walls of cassava plants. Because the resulting cyanide derivatives are volatile, processing methods that induce such exposure are common traditional means of cassava preparation; foodstuffs are usually made from cassava after extended blanching, boiling, or fermentation. Food products made from cassava plants include garri (toasted cassava tubers), porridge-like fufu, the dough agbelima, and cassava flour.

Research efforts have developed a genetically modified cassava plant that downregulates linamarin production via an RNA interference mechanism.
