= Mohamad Bydon =

American neurosurgeon

- Born: Mohamad Bydon
- Education: Dartmouth College (BA); Yale School of Medicine (MD)
- Known for: Robotic and minimally invasive spine surgery; Stem cell therapy for spinal cord injury
- Scientific career
- Fields: Neurosurgery, spine surgery
- Workplaces: University of Chicago Medical Center (2025–present); Mayo Clinic; Johns Hopkins Hospital
- Website: www.uchicagomedicine.org/find-a-physician/physician/mohamad-bydon

Mohamad Bydon is a nationally recognized American neurosurgeon. Since July 2025 he has been the inaugural chair of the University of Chicago Department of Neurological Surgery, where he holds the Ginni and Mark Rometty Chair of Neurosurgery and the Stahl Professorship of Neuroscience.

Bydon is an international leader in minimally invasive and robotic approaches to complex spinal conditions. He was previously a neurosurgeon at the Mayo Clinic in Rochester, Minnesota, where he held the Charles B. and Ann L. Johnson Professorship of Neurosurgery. He led first-in-human stem cell trials of intrathecal autologous adipose-derived mesenchymal stem cells in patients with traumatic spinal cord injury.

== Early life and education ==
Bydon attended Cranbrook Kingswood School, a college preparatory school in Bloomfield Hills, Michigan. He studied at Dartmouth College for his Bachelor of Arts and earned his MD at the Yale School of Medicine, having completed a post-baccalaureate program at Johns Hopkins School of Medicine beforehand. He also did a research fellowship in stem cell biology at a Howard Hughes Medical Institute laboratory at the University of Michigan.

He trained in neurosurgery at Johns Hopkins Hospital, where he was an intern, resident, and later a clinical fellow in spinal oncology and complex spine surgery.

== Career ==
=== Mayo Clinic ===
Bydon joined the Mayo Clinic faculty after Johns Hopkins. He became a professor of neurosurgery there with joint appointments in orthopedic surgery and health services research. Within the Department of Neurologic Surgery he was Vice Chair for Diversity and Innovation, and at the broader institution he served as Executive Medical Director of Academic Affairs for Mayo Clinic International and as Assistant Dean of Education Enrichment and Innovation at the Mayo Clinic College of Medicine and Science.

In 2015 Bydon started a Minimally Invasive Spine Program at Mayo. He went on to launch a robotic spine surgery program in 2018, which Becker's Hospital Review described as one of the first in any academic neurosurgery department in the United States. He holds twelve patents on medical devices. By early 2020 he had performed his 100th robotic spinal surgery.

During the COVID-19 pandemic, Bydon was a co-author on a 2020 paper that analyzed Google Trends search data as a leading indicator of regional COVID-19 hot spots.

=== University of Chicago ===
The University of Chicago announced Bydon's recruitment in February 2025, and he took over the new department on July 1 of that year. Speaking to Becker's Spine Review that year, he said his early priorities at Chicago were to grow the department's robotic and minimally invasive spine programs and to expand its work on artificial intelligence in surgical outcomes. His Chicago laboratory uses machine learning on large surgical datasets to study outcomes after spine surgery.

In October 2025 Bydon led a complex reconstructive surgery on a two-year-old patient who had sustained a near-internal decapitation in a road traffic accident in Germany; the patient was flown to Comer Children's Hospital in Chicago, where Bydon and a team reattached the skull to the cervical spine.

== First-in-human stem cell trials ==
Bydon led a first-in-human phase 1 trial (Clinical trial number NCT03308565 at ClinicalTrials.gov) of intrathecal autologous adipose-derived mesenchymal stem cells in adults with traumatic spinal cord injury. A 2020 paper in Mayo Clinic Proceedings described the first patient: a 53-year-old man left with a complete ASIA grade A cervical injury after a surfing accident, who began walking again after receiving 100 million autologous adipose-derived mesenchymal stem cells delivered intrathecally.

The full trial reported its results in Nature Communications in 2024. Of the ten participants, seven improved by at least one ASIA grade at final follow-up. The investigators reported no serious adverse events from the cell therapy itself; the most common side effects were headache and musculoskeletal pain.

== Editorial and society roles ==
Bydon is the editor-in-chief of the International Journal of Neuroscience. He chairs the NeuroPoint Alliance, which runs national clinical-data registries for neurosurgery. He has also held an editorial board seat at Journal of Neurosurgery: Spine and committee roles in the American Association of Neurological Surgeons and the Congress of Neurological Surgeons.

== Awards and honors ==
The Congress of Neurological Surgeons gave Bydon its Paper of the Year Award in 2021. He has held two named professorships and a named Chair: the Charles B. and Ann L. Johnson Professorship of Neurosurgery at Mayo Clinic, and the Stahl Professorship of Neuroscience, as well as the Ginni and Mark Rometty Chair of Neurosurgery at the University of Chicago.

== Selected publications ==
- Bydon M, Dietz AB, Goncalves S, et al. (2020). "CELLTOP Clinical Trial: First Report From a Phase 1 Trial of Autologous Adipose Tissue–Derived Mesenchymal Stem Cells in the Treatment of Paralysis Due to Traumatic Spinal Cord Injury". Mayo Clinic Proceedings. 95 (2): 406–414. doi:10.1016/j.mayocp.2019.10.008. PMID 31785831.
- Bydon M, Qu W, Moinuddin FM, et al. (2024). "Intrathecal delivery of adipose-derived mesenchymal stem cells in traumatic spinal cord injury: Phase I trial". Nature Communications. 15: 2201. doi:10.1038/s41467-024-46259-y. PMID 38561341.
