= Myelopathy =

Disorder of the spinal cord

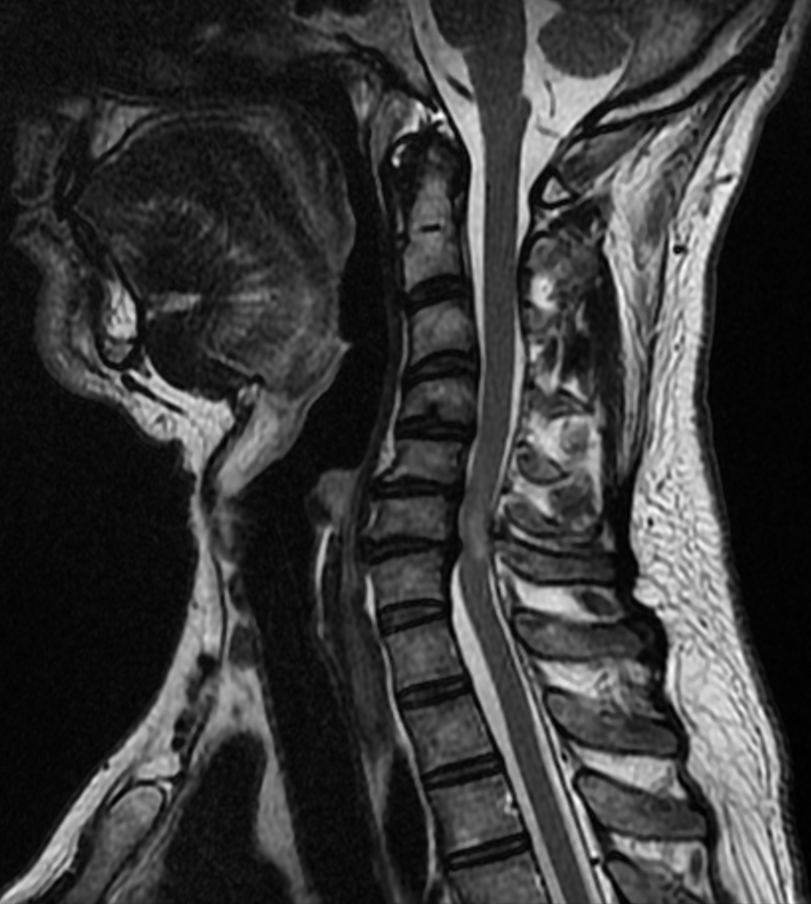
- Cervical myelopathy at the C6-C7 level.
- Specialty: Neurology
- Complications: myelitis
- Causes: Narrowing of the spinal cord (spinal stenosis)

Myelopathy describes any neurologic deficit related to the spinal cord. When due to trauma, myelopathy is known as (acute) spinal cord injury. When inflammatory, it is known as myelitis. Disease that is vascular in nature is known as vascular myelopathy.

The most common form of myelopathy in humans, cervical spondylotic myelopathy (CSM) also called degenerative cervical myelopathy, results from narrowing of the spinal canal (spinal stenosis) ultimately causing compression of the spinal cord. In Asian populations, spinal cord compression often occurs due to a different, inflammatory process affecting the posterior longitudinal ligament.

== Presentation ==
Clinical signs and symptoms depend on which spinal cord level (cervical, thoracic, or lumbar) is affected and the extent (anterior, posterior, or lateral) of the pathology, and may include:

- Upper motor neuron signs—weakness, spasticity, clumsiness, altered tonus, hyperreflexia and pathological reflexes, including Hoffmann's sign and inverted plantar reflex (positive Babinski sign)
- Lower motor neuron signs—weakness, clumsiness in the muscle group innervated at the level of spinal cord compromise, muscle atrophy, hyporeflexia, muscle hypotonicity or flaccidity, fasciculations
- Sensory deficits
- Bowel/bladder symptoms and sexual dysfunction

== Diagnosis ==
Myelopathy is primarily diagnosed by clinical exam findings. Because the term myelopathy describes a clinical syndrome that can be caused by many pathologies the differential diagnosis of myelopathy is extensive. In some cases the onset of myelopathy is rapid, in others, such as CSM, the course may be insidious with symptoms developing slowly over a period of months. As a consequence, the diagnosis of CSM is often delayed. As the disease is thought to be progressive, this may impact negatively on outcome.

== Etiology ==
Once the clinical diagnosis myelopathy is established, the underlying cause must be investigated. Most commonly this involves medical imaging. The best way to visualize the spinal cord is magnetic resonance imaging (MRI). Apart from T1 and T2 MRI images, which are commonly used for routine diagnosis, more recently researchers are exploring quantitative MRI signals. Further imaging modalities used for evaluating myelopathy include plain X-rays for detecting arthritic changes of the bones, and Computer Tomography, which is often used for pre-operative planning of surgical interventions for cervical spondylotic myelopathy. Angiography is used to examine blood vessels in suspected cases of vascular myelopathy.

The presence and severity of myelopathy can also be evaluated by means of transcranial magnetic stimulation (TMS), a neurophysiological method that allows the measurement of the time required for a neural impulse to cross the pyramidal tracts, starting from the cerebral cortex and ending at the anterior horn cells of the cervical, thoracic or lumbar spinal cord. This measurement is called Central Conduction Time (CCT). TMS can aid physicians to:

- Determine whether myelopathy exists
- Identify the level of the spinal cord where myelopathy is located. This is especially useful in cases where more than two lesions may be responsible for the clinical symptoms and signs, such as in patients with two or more cervical disc hernias
- Follow-up the progression of myelopathy in time, for example before and after cervical spine surgery

TMS can also help in the differential diagnosis of different causes of pyramidal tract damage.

== Treatment ==
The treatment and prognosis of myelopathy depends on the underlying cause: myelopathy caused by infection requires medical treatment with pathogen specific antibiotics. Similarly, specific treatments exist for multiple sclerosis, which may also present with myelopathy. As outlined above, the most common form of myelopathy is secondary to degeneration of the cervical spine. Newer findings have challenged the existing controversy with respect to surgery for cervical spondylotic myelopathy by demonstrating that patients benefit from surgery.

== See also ==
- Surfer's myelopathy
- Tropical myeloneuropathies
- Canine degenerative myelopathy
