= University of Chicago Department of Neurological Surgery =

Academic neurosurgery department in Chicago, Illinois

The University of Chicago Department of Neurological Surgery is the neurosurgery department of University of Chicago Medicine in Hyde Park, Chicago. The program was founded in 1928 by Percival Bailey, a former resident of Harvey Cushing, and operated as a section of the Department of Surgery until January 1, 2021, when it was elevated to a standalone department. Mohamad Bydon became its first chair on July 1, 2025.

The department provides clinical services at the University of Chicago Medical Center, including the Center for Care and Discovery, Comer Children's Hospital, and the Duchossois Center for Advanced Medicine. The University of Chicago Medical Center placed 40th nationally for adult neurology and neurosurgery in the 2025–26 U.S. News & World Report Best Hospitals tables.

== History ==
=== Founding and Bailey years (1928–1939) ===
Neurosurgery at the University of Chicago was founded in 1928 by Percival Bailey, who had trained under Harvey Cushing at the Peter Bent Brigham Hospital in Boston. Bailey was recruited by Dallas B. Phemister, the first chair of the Department of Surgery, to establish a neurosurgical service and residency on the South Side campus. He left in 1939 to lead neurology at the Illinois Neuropsychiatric Institute.

Paul C. Bucy, Bailey's first resident, collaborated with Heinrich Klüver of the university's psychology department on temporal-lobe ablation experiments in rhesus monkeys beginning in December 1936; the resulting behavioral syndrome was later named Klüver–Bucy syndrome. Other neurosurgeons trained in the program in the 1930s included Earl A. Walker, who in 1947 succeeded Walter Dandy as neurosurgeon-in-chief at Johns Hopkins Hospital, and Ralph B. Cloward, who later pioneered anterior cervical discectomy and fusion. Theodor Rasmussen held a faculty appointment at Chicago before returning to Montreal in 1954, where he later directed the Montreal Neurological Institute.

=== Section under the Department of Surgery (1954–2020) ===
Joseph P. Evans served as section chief from 1954 to 1967. John F. "Sean" Mullan succeeded him and led the section until 1992, also serving as acting chair of the Department of Surgery from 1970 to 1972. During his tenure the group published on endovascular treatment of intracranial aneurysms and arteriovenous malformations and on balloon compression for trigeminal neuralgia. A separate Department of Neurology was established in 1976. David M. Frim led the section from 2007 to 2020.

=== Department of Neurological Surgery (2021–present) ===
On January 1, 2021, neurosurgery was separated from the Department of Surgery to form the standalone Department of Neurological Surgery, with Bakhtiar Yamini as interim chair. On February 10, 2025, the university announced the appointment of Mohamad Bydon, previously a professor of neurosurgery at the Mayo Clinic in Rochester, Minnesota, as the first chair, effective July 1, 2025. An intraoperative magnetic resonance imaging (iMRI) suite at the Center for Care and Discovery entered clinical use in 2026.

== Leadership ==
- Percival Bailey (1928–1939; founder)
- Joseph P. Evans (1954–1967)
- John F. "Sean" Mullan (1967–1992)
- David M. Frim (2007–2020)
- Bakhtiar Yamini (2021–2025; interim)
- Mohamad Bydon (2025–present; first chair)

== Research ==
Issam A. Awad leads the department's vascular neurosurgery program. In 2020 Awad and collaborators reported in Nature Communications that the gut microbiome is associated with disease activity in human cerebral cavernous malformations. Awad served as the 51st president of the Congress of Neurological Surgeons in 2001.

Mohamad Bydon, the department's first chair, has led first-in-human trials of stem cell therapy for chronic spinal cord injury. His group also applies machine learning methods to neurosurgery, including predictive models for cervical spondylotic myelopathy from electronic health records and machine-learning approaches to neurosurgical operating-room scheduling.

Peter C. Warnke directs the department's stereotactic and functional neurosurgery program. He is a clinical collaborator on a multi-institutional brain–computer interface program studying intracortical microstimulation of the somatosensory cortex for sensory restoration in tetraplegia.

Timothy F. Witham conducts research on augmented reality and virtual reality applications in spine surgery.

== Notable faculty ==
- Percival Bailey (1892–1973), founder of the section
- Paul C. Bucy (1904–1992), first resident; co-discoverer of Klüver–Bucy syndrome
- Earl A. Walker (1907–1995), Chicago faculty 1937–1947; later chief of neurosurgery at Johns Hopkins
- Ralph B. Cloward (1908–2000), trained at Chicago in 1938; pioneered anterior cervical discectomy and fusion
- Theodor Rasmussen (1910–2002), Chicago faculty before directing the Montreal Neurological Institute
- John F. "Sean" Mullan (1925–2015), section chief 1967–1992
- Issam A. Awad, vascular neurosurgery; past president of the Congress of Neurological Surgeons
- Mohamad Bydon, first chair (2025–present)
- Peter C. Warnke, stereotactic and functional neurosurgery
- Timothy F. Witham, spinal neurosurgery
- Youssef G. Comair, epilepsy surgery
- Pat M. Raksin, neurotrauma and cerebrovascular neurosurgery
- Arthur J. DiPatri Jr., pediatric neurosurgery
