= Anthony Roberts (disambiguation) =

Anthony Roberts (born 1970) is an Australian politician.

Anthony Roberts may also refer to:

- Anthony Roberts (basketball) (1955–1997), American basketball player
- Anthony Roberts (cricketer) (born 1962), South African cricketer
- Anthony E. Roberts (1803–1885), American politician
- Anthony Roberts (surgeon), British surgeon
- Anthony K. Roberts (1939–2005), American actor and photographer
- Anthony Russell-Roberts (1944–2024), British opera manager
- Anthony Roberts (Trinidad and Tobago politician)

== See also ==
- Tony Roberts (disambiguation)
