= UChicago Medicine =

Hospital network by the University of Chicago

The University of Chicago Medicine, branded as UChicago Medicine, is an academic hospital network owned by the University of Chicago. It operates hospitals and clinics on the South Side of Chicago, in the city's southern suburbs, and in Northwest Indiana.

== About ==
UChicago Medicine comprises The University of Chicago Pritzker School of Medicine; The University of Chicago Biological Sciences Division, a section committed to scientific discovery; and The University of Chicago Medical Center. Thirteen Nobel Prize winners in physiology or medicine have been affiliated with The University of Chicago Medicine.

University of Chicago Medicine physicians are members of The University of Chicago Physicians Group, which includes about 900 physicians and covers the full array of medical and surgical specialties. The physicians are faculty members of the Pritzker School of Medicine.

These organizations are headed by Mark Anderson, MD, PhD, Dean of the Biological Sciences Division and the Pritzker School of Medicine, and executive vice president for medical affairs at the University of Chicago, and Thomas Jackiewicz, president of the University of Chicago Health System.

== History ==
The system was established with the opening of the University of Chicago Hospital on October 31, 1927. The university later took over responsibility for the Chicago Home for Destitute and Crippled Children, the Country Home for Convalescent Children, and the Chicago Lying-In Hospital, creating the University of Chicago Hospitals network. The system adopted its current name, The University of Chicago Medicine, in 2012.

UChicago Medicine merged with Ingalls Health System in 2016, adding Ingalls Memorial Hospital as the system's first community hospital and five clinics throughout Chicago's southern suburbs.

UChicago Medicine Crown Point, a multispecialty care center in Crown Point, Indiana, opened on April 29, 2024.

In 2025, UChicago Medicine announced the launch of a national cancer network, beginning with a partnership with AdventHealth Cancer Institute Shawnee Mission, expanding access to advanced cancer treatments and clinical trials.

== Locations ==
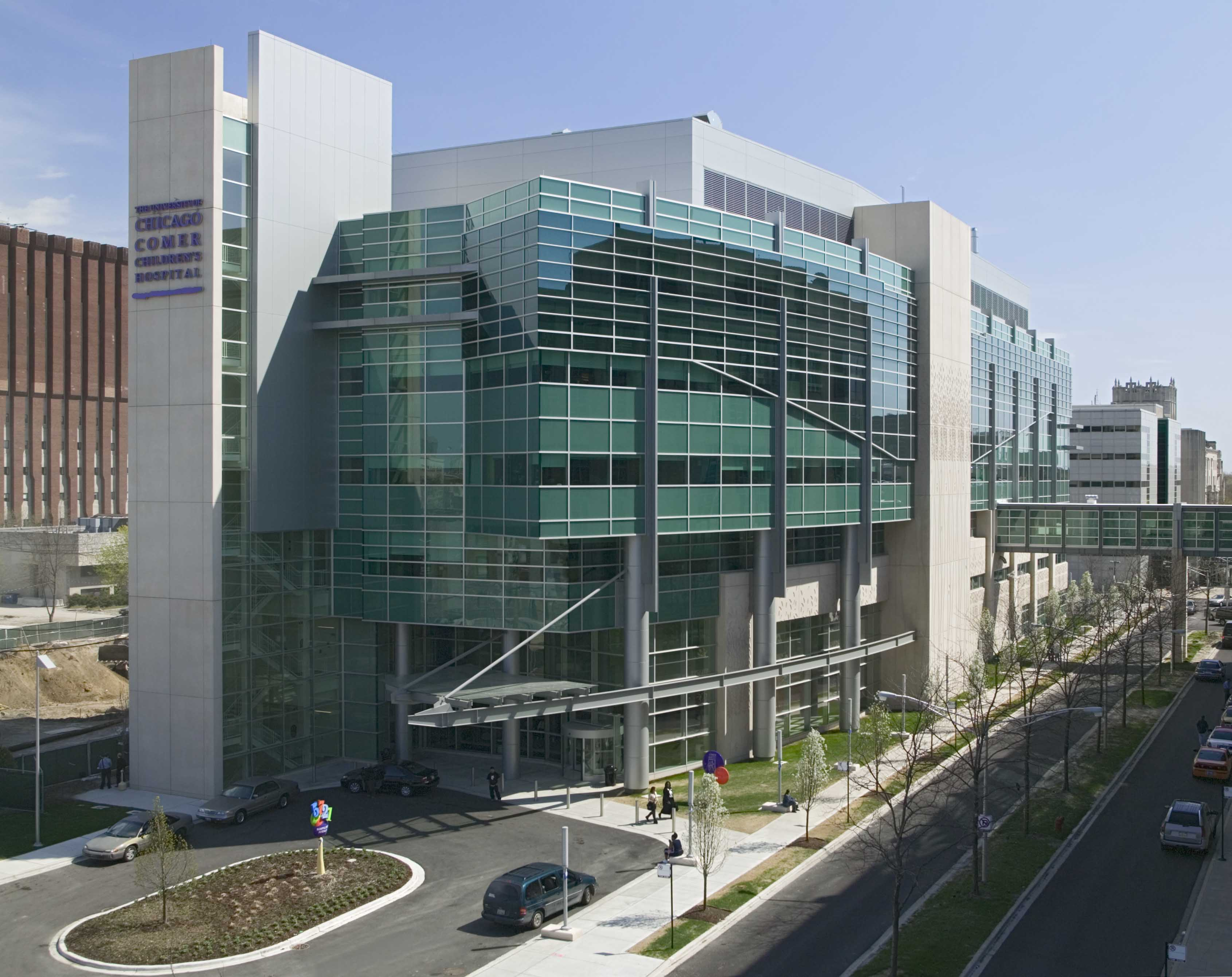
University of Chicago Comer Children's Hospital

- University of Chicago Medical Center
  - Center for Care and Discovery, the primary adult inpatient care facility (opened in 2013 at a cost of $700 million)
  - Bernard A. Mitchell Hospital, adult inpatient care facility which houses the Burn and Complex Wound Center
  - Comer Children's Hospital, including the university's Pediatric Level 1 Trauma Center
- University of Chicago Medicine Family Birth Center, a maternity and women's hospital
- Duchossois Center for Advanced Medicine, an outpatient care facility
- Pritzker School of Medicine
- The Knapp Center for Biomedical Discovery (KCBD)
- The University of Chicago Comprehensive Cancer Center (in the main campus and other locations)
  - Comprehensive Cancer Center at Silver Cross Hospital, New Lenox, Illinois
- UChicago Medicine Ingalls Memorial, Harvey, Illinois
  - UChicago Medicine at Ingalls - Calumet City
  - UChicago Medicine at Ingalls - Crestwood
  - UChicago Medicine at Ingalls - Flossmoor
  - UChicago Medicine Outpatient Center at Ingalls - Harvey
  - UChicago Medicine at Ingalls - South Holland
  - UChicago Medicine at Ingalls - Tinley Park
- UChicago Medicine AdventHealth
  - UChicago Medicine AdventHealth Bolingbrook
  - UChicago Medicine AdventHealth GlenOaks in Glendale Heights
  - UChicago Medicine AdventHealth - Hinsdale
  - UChicago Medicine AdventHealth La Grange
- UChicago Medicine Crown Point, Crown Point, Indiana
  - UChicago Medicine Cancer Care Center at Chesterton
  - UChicago Medicine Cancer Care Center at Valparaiso
- regional physician offices located throughout the Chicago area

== See also ==
- University of Chicago Department of Neurological Surgery
