= Tony Roberts =

Tony Roberts may refer to:

- Tony Roberts (actor) (1939–2025), American actor
- Tony Roberts (author), British author of the Casca series of fantasy novels since 2006
- Tony Roberts (footballer) (born 1969), Welsh football player
- Tony Roberts (historian), Australian historian
- Tony Roberts (poet) (born 1949), British poet
- Tony Roberts (racing driver) (1938–2001), winner of the 1969 Bathurst 500
- Tony Roberts (sportscaster) (1928–2023), American sports announcer
- Tony T. Roberts (born 1963), American stand-up comedian and actor

== See also ==
- Anthony Roberts (disambiguation)
