= International Spinal Cord Society =

Coordinates: 51.79965°N 0.80235°W

The International Spinal Cord Society
- Abbreviation: ISCoS
- Formation: 1961
- Type: INGO
- Purpose: humanitarian
- Headquarters: Aylesbury, United Kingdom
- Location: Stoke Mandeville Hospital
- Region served: worldwide
- Members: over 1000 Clinicians and Scientists from 87 countries
- Official language: english
- President: Prof Fin Biering-Sørensen
- Main organ: The Officers of ISCoS
- Website: http://www.iscos.org.uk/

The International Spinal Cord Society (ISCoS) was founded in 1961 as the International Medical Society of Paraplegia. It is an INGO, whose purpose is to study all problems relating to lesions of the spinal cord.

== History ==
The International Medical Society of Paraplegia was founded in 1961. The first President was Sir Ludwig Guttmann.
In September 2001, at the General Meeting in Nottwil, Switzerland, it was agreed another name of the Society: The International Spinal Cord Society (ISCoS).

== Objectives ==
- to study all problems relating to lesions of the spinal cord
- enables scientific exchange between the members
- Advice, support, promote, coordinate research, development and evaluation activities in context with spinal cord injuries worldwide
- Counseling, support in the care of patients involved
- Counseling, support of those responsible for education and training of medical professionals

== Presidents ==
1961–1970	Prof. Sir Ludwig Guttmann	Founder and First President
1970–1973	Dr Herb Talbot	(United States) USA
1973–1977	Dr Albert Tricot	Belgium
1977–1980	Prof. Volkmar Paeslack	Germany
1980–1984	Sir George Bedbrook	Australia
1984–1988	Prof. Alain Rossier	(France) Switzerland
1988–1992	Dr Ed Carter	(United States) USA
1992–1996	Dr Paul Dollfus	France
1996–2000	Dr Hans Frankel	(United Kingdom) UK
2000–2004	Prof. Takaaki Ikata	Japan
2004–2008	Prof. W Donovan	(United States) USA
2008–2010	Mr W El-Masry	(United Kingdom) UK
2010–2012	Prof Fin Biering-Sørensen	(Denmark) DK
2012–2014	Associate Prof Doug Brown	Australia
2014–2018	Prof Jean-Jacques Wyndaele	Belgium

== Members ==
- Full members
- Associate members
- Senior members
- Emeritus members
- Fellowship of ISCoS
- Affiliated members

=== Affiliated members ===
- American Paraplegia Society (APS)
- American Spinal Injury Association (ASIA)
- Asian Spinal Cord Network (ASCoN)
- Association Francophone Internationale des Groupes d'Animation de la Paraplégie (AFIGAP)
- Australian and New Zealand Spinal Cord Society (ANZSCoS)
- Chinese Association of Rehabilitation of Disabled Persons – Society of Spinal Cord Injury (CARDP – SoSCI)
- Deutschsprachige Medizinische Gesellschaft für Paraplegie (DMGP)
- Dutch Flemish Spinal Cord Society (DUFSCoS)
- Japan Medical Society of Spinal Cord Lesions(JASCoL)
- Latin American Society of Paraplegia (SLAP)
- Nordic Spinal Cord Society(NoSCoS)
- Romanian Spinal Cord Society (RoSCoS)
- Societá Medica Italiana di Paraplegia (SoMIPAR)
- Southern African Spinal Cord Association (SASCA)
- Spanish Society of Paraplegia (SEP)
- Spinal Cord Society – Indian Chapter
- Turkish Society of Spinal Cord Diseases (TrSCD)

== Journal ==
SPINAL CORD is the monthly publication of the International Spinal Cord Society.
The Editorial Office is at the Stoke Mandeville Hospital in UK. The Editor-in-Chief is Professor Lisa Harvey, University of Sydney, Australia.
