= George Bedbrook =

Founder of Paralympic movement in Australia

Sir George Bedbrook
- Born: 8 October 1921; Melbourne, Victoria, Australia
- Died: 6 October 1991 (aged 69); Perth, Western Australia
- Years active: 1951–1981
- Known for: Founding the Paralympic Movement in Australia
- Medical career
- Profession: Orthopaedic surgeon

Sir George Montario Bedbrook, OBE (8 October 1921 – 6 October 1991) was an Australian medical doctor and surgeon, who was the driving force in creating the Australian Paralympic movement and the Commonwealth Paraplegic Games, and helped to found the FESPIC Games.

== Personal ==
Bedbrook was born on 8 November 1921 in Melbourne, Victoria. His father was Arthur Bedbrook, a retired serviceman. His mother was Ethel Nora née Prince. He attended Coburg State School and the University High School, Melbourne. He received his bachelor's degree in medicine from the University of Melbourne in 1944. In 1946, he married Jessie Violet née Page, with whom he had two sons and three daughters. He died on 6 October 1991 in Sir Charles Gairdner Hospital.

== Academic and medical career ==
Bedbrook was an anatomy lecturer at the University of Melbourne from 1946 to 1950. In 1950, he earned an MS and a FRACS in 1950 from the University of Melbourne. Bedbrook then moved to the United Kingdom for three years, where he worked in orthopaedics. He gained a British recognised credential in 1951 when he became a Fellow of the Royal College of Surgeons. In 1953, Bedbrook moved back to Australia, where he and McKellar Hall started a private practice in orthopaedics. During this time, he became a member at the Royal Perth Hospital. In 1954, he founded the Department of Paraplegia at the hospital and continued to work in the department until 1972. He started working at the Department of Orthopaedic Surgery in 1956. He headed the Department of Orthopaedic Surgery at the Royal Perth Hospital from 1965 to 1975. He was the department's chairperson from 1979 to 1981. He was the President of the International Spinal Cord Society from 1980 to 1984. In 1988, he was the Director of the Spinal Injuries Programme and Clinical Sub-dean of the University of Western Australia. He retired from medicine in 1981.

While working as an academic and medical professional, he published 117 scientific papers and publications, and wrote two books, The Care and Management of Spinal Cord Injuries and Lifetime Care of the Paraplegic Patient. Bedbrook was the president of the International Medical Society of Paraplegia. He was preceded by Professor V. Paeslack of Germany and followed by Professor A. Rossier of Switzerland.

In 1970, he earned a Diploma in Physical and Rehabilitation Medicine from the University of Sydney. Bedbrook earned several honorary degrees, including an honorary MD from the University of Western Australia in 1973, an honorary FRCS from the Royal College of Surgeons of Edinburgh in 1981, an honorary Doctorate of Technology from Western Australian Institute of Technology in 1984, and an honorary FCRM from Western Australian Institute of Technology in 1987. Other accolades include the Betts' Medal, bestowed by the Australian Orthopaedic Association in 1972, and a Medal of Honour bestowed by the International Medical Society of Paraplegia in 1978.

== Paralympic movement ==
Ludwig Guttmann was the founder of the modern Paralympic Games that started with the Stoke Mandeville Games. Bedbook was challenged by Guttmann to bring organised sport to disabled people in Australia when Guttmann visited Bedbrook at the Royal Perth Hospital in 1956. The year after Guttmann's visit, Bedbrook helped Australia to send its first team to compete in the Stoke Mandeville Games. The first team consisted of seven athletes six of whom were from Bedbrook's ward at the hospital, and the seventh from Sydney. Bedbrook did extensive fundraising to help cover the travel expenses of the athletes from Royal Perth Hospital.

In 1962, Bedbrook was the primary organiser of the first Commonwealth Paraplegic Games in Perth, Western Australia, the counterpart of the regular British Empire and Commonwealth Games. He served as the Game's General Secretary. Guttmann presented Bedbrook with a Stoke Mandeville Games pennant during the games's opening ceremony. This pennant was prized because of the level of commitment it entailed to the disabled athletic ideal. Bedbrook, Hugh Leslie and John Grant were credited with making the games a huge success, with athletes such as Sally Haynes praising the friendliness and helpfulness of everyone working at the event.

In 1964, the International Stoke Mandeville Games Committee (ISMGC) held a meeting of managers and trainers in Tokyo, Japan. This meeting resulted in the enlargement of the number of nations represented by the organisation. Bedbrook nominated Australia for inclusion and the organisation's constitution was modified to include Australia alongside Argentina, Germany, Japan, and Rhodesia. This also resulted in Bedbrook becoming a member of the ISMGC that year. In 1967m the ISMGC set up a Medical Sub-Committee. Bedbrook was the first chair of this committee. In 1972, Bedbrook was replaced by Doctor J. Grant on the ISMGC. In 1964, Bedbrook served as the Australian team leader at the Paralympics. At the 1968 Tel Aviv Paralympics, Bedbrook served as the Australian SMGF Delegate.

In 1974, the fourth Commonwealth Paraplegic Games were held in Dunedin, New Zealand. Bedbrook served on the Medical Grading Committee for the Games. He also served on the Jury of Appeal for the Games. These games were the last Commonwealth Paraplegic Games, the decision having been made by the Commonwealth Games Committee, of which Bedbrook was the chairman. Bedbrook recommended that the games be replaced by a zone based competition, similar to the Pan-American Games. Consequently, he helped to found the FESPIC Games for Pacific Rim countries.

== PBF (The Paraplegic Benefit Fund) Australia ==
PBF Australia (The Paraplegic Benefit Fund) was founded by Sir George Bedbrook, a world-renowned spinal surgeon, who founded the Department of Paraplegia at Royal Perth Hospital in 1954. His commitment to the rehabilitation and care of Australians living with a spinal cord injury has received worldwide recognition. He was also the recipient of many distinctions and honours.

Sir George Bedbrook established PBF Australia in 1984 as he was frustrated by the lack of financial support available for patients living with a spinal cord injury. He found that 70% of patients were not eligible for any insurance or compensation payment following their spinal cord injury, with many being institutionalised after discharge from hospital.

== Recognition ==
Under authority of a Royal Warrant the Governor-General of the Commonwealth of Australia, at Government House, Perth, on 15th September 1978, conferred the Honour of Knighthood upon Sir George Montario BEDBROOK, O.B.E.

— The London Gazette

Bedbrook was made an Officer of the Order of the British Empire in 1965. He was knighted in the June 1978 Queen's Birthday Honours. In 2011, he was one of the first people to be inducted into the Australian Paralympic Hall of Fame, along with Frank Ponta and Louise Sauvage. In 2022, inducted into Sport Australia Hall of Fame.

== See also ==
- Australia at the Paralympics

== Bibliography ==
- Brittain, Ian (2010). The Paralympic Games Explained (1 ed.). London: Routeledge. ISBN 978-0-415-47658-4. OCLC 244057438.
- Leigh, N. E. (7 November 1978). "Page 13299 of Issue 47682". The London Gazette. No. 47682. p. 13299.
- Royal Perth Hospital (2006). "Emeritus Consultants Biographies". Perth, Western Australia: Royal Perth Hospital.
- Scruton, Joan (1998). Stoke Mandeville Road to the Paralympics (1 ed.). Brill: Peterhouse. ISBN 0-946312-10-9. OCLC 39713961.
- Wheelchair Sport WA (2009). "Wheelchair Sport WA – History". Archived from the original on 23 August 2011.
