= Chicago trauma center campaign =

Chicago grassroots direct action campaign

Trauma Center Campaign
- Date: 2010–2015 (5 years)
- Location: South Side, Chicago
- Caused by: Closing of University of Chicago Medicine's adult trauma center in 1988; Racial disparities in access to trauma care; Gun violence
- Methods: Marches; Picketing; Civil disobedience; Die-ins; Lock-ons; Sit-ins
- Result: Creation of an adult, level-1 trauma center at the University of Chicago

Parties
Fearless Leading by the Youth (FLY); Southside Together Organizing for Power (STOP); Kenwood-Oakland Community Organization (KOCO); Students for Health Equity (SHE); Jewish Council on Urban Affairs (JCUA); National Nurses United	University of Chicago; University of Chicago Medical Center

Lead figures
	University of Chicago President: Robert J. Zimmer; University of Chicago Executive Vice President for Medical Affairs: Kenneth Polonsky; University of Chicago Medical Center President: Sharon O'Keefe

The Trauma Center Campaign was a grassroots direct action campaign that induced the University of Chicago Medical Center (UCMC) to open an adult, level-1 trauma center. The campaign was organized by the Trauma Care Coalition, a coalition of community and student organizations founded in 2010 by the Black youth community organization Fearless Leading by the Youth (FLY) and its parent organization, Southside Together Organizing for Power (STOP).

In December 2015, after years of protests that attracted national media attention, UCMC met the campaign's demand by announcing plans to establish an adult trauma center. The trauma center opened in 2018. This reduced the significant racial disparity in access to trauma care in Chicago, which previously had no adult, level-1 trauma center on its predominately Black South Side.

The Trauma Center Campaign was part of an upsurge of racial justice activism across the United States in the 2010s that coincided with the rise of the Black Lives Matter movement. Trauma center activists employed Black Lives Matter rhetoric and maintained connections to other racial justice struggles in Chicago, such as protests around the murder of Laquan McDonald and the #ByeAnita campaign to prevent the re-election of Cook County State's Attorney Anita Alvarez.

== Background ==
The University of Chicago Medical Center closed its adult trauma center in 1988 for financial reasons, though it continued to operate a pediatric trauma center. The next year, Michael Reese Hospital also closed its trauma center, citing financial strain caused in part by the loss of UCMC's trauma center. As a result, ambulance transport times from the Southeast Side of Chicago to a trauma center were found in 2011 to be 50% longer on average than those from other parts of Chicago. A 2013 study from Northwestern University found that those longer transport times were resulting in higher mortality rates and called the South Side of Chicago a "trauma desert".

On August 15, 2010, 18-year-old Damian Turner was critically injured in a drive-by shooting near the intersection of 61st Street and Cottage Grove Avenue, roughly four blocks away from UCMC. Turner was a community organizer who had co-founded FLY and helped to lead a campaign by FLY to improve conditions at the Cook County Temporary Juvenile Detention Center. Since UCMC did not have an adult trauma center, he was transported over nine miles by ambulance to Northwestern Memorial Hospital, where he died. His death brought renewed attention to the lack of trauma care on Chicago's South Side and spurred FLY and STOP to found the Trauma Care Coalition. Other members of the coalition included the Kenwood-Oakland Community Organization, Students for Health Equity (a group of University of Chicago students), the Jewish Council on Urban Affairs, National Nurses United (the labor union representing UCMC nurses), and local churches and religious leaders.

FLY argued that the lack of a South Side trauma center was an instance of structural racism, pointing out that even though gun violence disproportionately impacts Black communities, the predominately white North Side of Chicago had far better access to trauma care than the predominately Black South Side.

== Campaign timeline ==
FLY began organizing protests to demand a trauma center in late 2010. The first year of the campaign saw multiple demonstrations and panel discussions on the issue at the University of Chicago. UCMC administrators maintained that opening a trauma center was prohibitively expensive and would negatively impact the medical center's other services. Trauma centers typically operate at a financial loss because trauma patients tend to be poor and uninsured.

In May 2012, trauma center activists drew attention to the lack of trauma care on the South Side by marching 10 miles from the site where Damian Turner was shot to Northwestern Memorial Hospital, where he was treated.

In January 2013, the Trauma Center Coalition staged a sit-in at UCMC's recently completed (but not yet opened) Center for Care and Discovery. The University of Chicago Police Department (UCPD) responded by shoving participants to the ground and arresting four of them. Campaign activists described the police response as "very brutal" and accused the UCPD of racial bias in its treatment of protesters; a petition asking the university to explain the violence and drop the charges against the arrested received over 1,100 signatures. Days later, 200 people left flowers at the office of University of Chicago President Robert Zimmer as part of a "flower vigil" to commemorate victims of gun violence and continue to press for a trauma center at UCMC.

In February 2013, an undercover UCPD officer infiltrated a protest that was demanding that charges against the arrested protesters be dropped. After The Chicago Maroon (the university's student newspaper) exposed the officer, the university disavowed the undercover operation, with Provost Thomas Rosenbaum and President Robert Zimmer calling it "totally antithetical to our values" and "deeply problematic for discourse and mutual respect on campus." The university consequently launched an investigation of the UCPD, as a result of which a UCPD commander was fired. He later sued the university for wrongful termination, alleging he had been "scapegoated", and was awarded $150,000 by a jury.

In November 2013, activists from the Trauma Care Coalition carried large coffins to UCMC to symbolize the lives lost due the lack of adult trauma care in South Side neighborhoods. Over 150 protesters took part in the demonstration.

In May 2014, seven protesters chained themselves together and blocked entrances to a construction site on the University of Chicago's campus in an act of civil disobedience. UCPD forcibly removed them, injuring one protester who was taken to the emergency room for treatment. The demonstration called on the University of Chicago to prioritize the creation of a trauma center over its bid to host the Obama Presidential Center, which University officials were preparing at the time. Later that week, over 300 demonstrators demanding a trauma center rallied at UCMC.

In October 2014, trauma center activists protested at a gala kicking off the University of Chicago's "Inquiry and Impact" fundraising campaign. That campaign aimed to raise $4.5 billion, which the Trauma Care Coalition cited as evidence that the university possessed the financial resources to open a trauma center.

In December 2014, UCMC announced that its pediatric trauma center would begin treating 16- and 17-year-old patients. It had previously only accepted patients 15 years old and younger. Campaign leaders considered the announcement a victory but continued to demand an adult trauma center.

In March 2015, roughly 70 activists from the Trauma Care Coalition shut down Michigan Avenue outside of a University of Chicago fundraising event being held at the Ritz-Carlton Hotel in downtown Chicago. Nine protesters were arrested and charged with obstruction of traffic after chaining themselves together and obstructing the northbound lanes. The charges were later dropped.

In June 2015, protests for a trauma center disrupted the University of Chicago's annual Alumni Weekend. Nine protesters, including one U. of C. graduate student, staged a sit-in in the lobby of the university's administration building and barricaded the doors with bicycle locks. They were arrested after firefighters broke through a wall and window to end the barricade. All of the non-student arrestees were banned from the university's campus, which an open letter signed by 80 faculty members later argued was a violation of the university's stated values regarding freedom of expression. Other protests during the 2015 Alumni Weekend included a 150-person rally and the disruption of an award ceremony at which the University of Chicago's president, Robert Zimmer, was speaking. An audience member at the award ceremony was arrested and charged with battery after he allegedly attacked protesters.

In September 2015, UCMC announced a plan to partner with Sinai Health System to open an adult, level-1 trauma center at Holy Cross Hospital. Three months later, after the deal with Sinai fell apart, UCMC announced a $270 million plan to open a trauma center on its own campus and expand its cancer center, the revenue from which would offset the cost of operating the trauma center.

== Legacy ==
UCMC's trauma center opened on May 1, 2018. In 2020, a study published in the Journal of the American Medical Association found that the new trauma center had reduced racial disparities in ambulance transport times for traumatic injury patients. The campaign has been seen as a significant victory for Black youth-led community organizing, with Crain's Chicago Business writing that "its youthful leadership and strategic nimbleness make it an example—not just here in Chicago but nationally—that activists can emerge victorious."
