= UChicago Medicine AdventHealth Bolingbrook =

- AdventHealth and UChicago Medicine

Geography
- Location: 500 Remington Boulevard, Bolingbrook, Illinois, United States
- Coordinates: 41°40′52″N 88°5′5″W

Organization
- Care system: Private hospital
- Type: General hospital
- Religious affiliation: Seventh-day Adventist Church

Services
- Emergency department: Level II trauma center
- Beds: 138

Helipads
- Helipad: Aeronautical chart and airport information for 45IS at SkyVector

History
- Former names: Adventist Bolingbrook Hospital; AMITA Health Adventist Medical Center Bolingbrook; AdventHealth Bolingbrook
- Opened: January 14, 2008

Links
- Website: www.uchicagomedicineadventhealth.org/uchicago-medicine-adventhealth-bolingbrook
- Lists: Hospitals in Illinois

Adventist Bolingbrook Hospital (doing business as UChicago Medicine AdventHealth Bolingbrook) is a non-profit hospital campus in Bolingbrook, Illinois, United States that is part of a joint venture between AdventHealth and UChicago Medicine. The hospital is a primary stroke center and also a designated Level II trauma center by the Illinois Department of Public Health. When it opened in 2008, the hospital became the newest built in the state in twenty-five years.

== History ==
=== 1977-2008 ===
In 1977, Hinsdale Hospital applied for a certificate of need with the Illinois government to have a hospital built in Bolingbrook, Illinois. In February 1988, the certificate of need was approved for the hospital. In late July 1989, Hinsdale Hospital changed its mind about having a hospital built there, due to so many hospitals closing in the state.

In early November 2001, Adventist Health System announced that it wanted a hospital built with 130 beds built attached its Bolingbrook Medical Center. In late April 2004, Adventist Health System applied with the Illinois Health Facilities Planning Board to have a $152 million, 138-bed hospital built in Bolingbrook, Illinois. Their request to have the hospital built was denied. In early November 2004, the Illinois Health Facilities Planning Board approved the certificate of need from Adventist Health System to have a hospital built in Bolingbrook, Illinois. It would be built west of the Interstate 55/Illinois Route 53 Interchange.

In late November 2006, a three-story, 74,298 square foot (6,902.5 m^{2}) medical office building was approved by trustees to be built north of the hospital and to be connected to Adventist Bolingbrook Hospital by a heated skyway. On January 14, 2008, Adventist Bolingbrook Hospital opened to patients. The 300,000 square foot (28,000 m^{2}) hospital, became the newest in Illinois in twenty-five years after three years of construction.

=== 2013-present ===
In late January 2013, Adventist Bolingbrook Hospital requested that it be reimbursed $7.1 million, after paying property taxes to Will County from 2008 to 2011, while waiting for its tax exemption status. In early December, the chapel at Adventist Bolingbrook Hospital was named after Ron Hawkins, who served two terms on the hospitals foundation board.

On June 17, 2014, Adventist Midwest Health from Hinsdale, Illinois, a subsidiary of Adventist Health System; and Alexian Brothers Health System from Arlington Heights, Illinois a subsidiary of Ascension Health, signed a letter to create a joint venture company. The nine-hospital company would be the third largest in Illinois. On February 1, 2015, the joint venture AMITA Health was created by Adventist Midwest Health and Alexian Health System.

On October 21, 2021, AMITA Health announced that it would split up. On April 1, 2022, it split up and AMITA Health Adventist Medical Center Bolingbrook rebranded to AdventHealth Bolingbrook. On September 13, UChicago Medicine announced that it planned to purchase a controlling interest in the AdventHealth hospitals in Illinois. The joint venture became finalized on January 1, 2023.

On November 7, 2025, UChicago Medicine AdventHealth Bolingbrook had a groundbreaking for a 15,000 square foot (1,400 m^{2}) expansion, to add two catheterization laboratories for $21.6 million. Bulley & Andrews was hired to do the construction. On September 30, 2026, the laboratories opened.

== Services ==
By late January 2015, Adventist Bolingbrook Hospital was still struggling to fill its beds. To take care of this problem the hospital applied with the Illinois Health Facilities and Services Review Board for permission to change twenty-four of its medical-surgical beds to psychiatric beds in late April.

== Partnership ==
On April 19, 2025, the hospital began a partnership with NorthStar Anesthesia to help UChicago Medicine AdventHealth Bolingbrook move to a anesthesia care team model.

== Awards and recognitions ==
The hospital received a grade A from The Leapfrog Group from fall 2013 to spring 2015, and again from May 2019 to May 2020. It received a grade B in November 2021 and May 2022, and it received a grade A again from November 2022 to November 2025. In May 2026 it was given a grade B, the hospital returned to a grade A in November.

== See also ==
- List of Seventh-day Adventist hospitals
- List of stroke centers in the United States
- List of trauma centers in the United States
