= Anthony Roberts (surgeon) =

British surgeon

Anthony Roberts OBE. OStJ FRCS FRCSG FRSB FRGS (born 1938) is a British retired plastic and reconstructive surgeon. He was a consultant plastic and hand surgeon at Stoke Mandeville Hospital, Buckinghamshire from 1985 to 2001, and director of the Oxford regional burn unit at Stoke Mandeville Hospital. He then worked for periods for the Ministry of Defence as a plastic surgeon and as a general surgeon during the years 2001 to 2005.

He was a lecturer in chemical engineering at the University of Surrey and then returned to Cambridge University, and then to Oxford University to study medicine. After qualification in 1972 he trained in surgery and then plastic surgery, before becoming a consultant in 1985.

He was appointed an honorary professor at the Chinese University of Hong Kong.

He has worked or taught in 45 countries, and operated in 25 of them, across five continents.

He was awarded an OBE in 2012 for his work in wars and disasters, for his research and for his work and teaching around the world, as well as for his contributions to ornithology and to the community on the Isle of Wight.

== Early life and education ==
Roberts was born in Essex. After being cured of tuberculosis, he went to Woodford Green Primary School aged almost eight. From there he won a scholarship to Bancroft's School and, with further scholarships, went from there to the University of Leeds and University of Cambridge to study chemical engineering.

Following this he went on to read medicine at the Universities of Cambridge and Oxford.

== Careers ==
His first career was as a chemical engineer. Training at the University of Leeds (1957–1961), researching at the University of Cambridge, where he also supervised physical chemistry and was a demonstrator in physics in the Cavendish Laboratory. He was a lecturer in Chemical and Biochemical Engineering at the University of Surrey (1964–1967) and also spent periods in industry (1961–1966).

In 1967 he returned to St Catharine's College, Cambridge to read medical sciences, and completed his medical degree at Worcester College, Oxford in 1972. Within these years he worked as a demonstrator in anatomy at the University of Zambia and tutored anatomy at the University of Oxford.

After medical registration, he worked with his wife in Lesotho, South Africa and Rhodesia for six months and then returned to England to train – firstly in surgery and then as a plastic surgeon in Oxford, the Birmingham Accident Hospital, Newcastle, Leeds, Bradford, and Melbourne, Australia.

He was appointed a consultant plastic and hand surgeon at Stoke Mandeville Hospital and director of the Oxford Region Burn Unit in 1985. This also involved clinics and/or operating in Reading, Northampton, Buckingham and Milton Keynes. During this time he was actively involved in burn disasters in Bradford, Greece and Hong Kong, and also in planning and teaching for the first Gulf War for which he was made an honorary member of the United States Air Force. He later volunteered to work with UKMed in Sarajevo during and after the Bosnian War.

He visited Hong Kong and Cairo to teach and operate for several weeks a year. He was also the travelling professor of the International Society of Burn Injuries to Australia, Hong Kong and Papua New Guinea in 1993.

His other work was teaching junior military surgeons from the United Kingdom, Egypt and Greece. He was the Hon Civilian Consultant Advisor in Plastic Surgery to the Royal Air Force from 1998 to 2002, before being appointed Hon Civilian Consultant.

He retired from full-time NHS work in 2001. He has since worked in disasters in Haiti (with Merlin), in the Philippines (with UK-Med), in South Sudan (with Save the Children), and he worked in wars in Azerbaijan (with University College London), and in Kosovo.

== Research and publications ==
- 1961: British Coke Research Association
- 1961–1964: Research student in chemical engineering at the University of Cambridge, researching heat transfer in fluidised beds
- 1966: ICI Agricultural Division, working on a potential new method of making fertilisers
- 1981–1982: His surgical research has predominantly been on burns and also on hand and reconstructive surgery, including a year in Melbourne at the O'Brien Microvascular Research Centre under Bernard O’Brien and Wayne Morrison
- 1991: Founded the charity Stoke Mandeville Burns and Reconstructive Surgery Research Trust (later renamed Restore – Burn and Wound Research), whose Patron is His Royal Highness, The Duke of Kent KG FRS. Roberts was Chairman (2006–2010) and then President (2011– ). The charity have done major work on the pathology of the burn wound and subsequent attempts to reduce scarring. They have produced multiple research degrees, publications and papers to date.
- He has done ornithological research in the UK, Europe, Australia, USA and Africa from 1976 to the present day

== Books ==
- Scholarship Boy to Engineer, Plastic Surgeon and Sportsman. Published by Matador, part of Troubadour Publishing
- Plastic Surgery in Wars, Disasters and Civilian Life. Published by Frontline Books, a military history imprint of Pen and Sword Books
- Scholarship Boy, Life Away from Work. Published by Troubadour Publishing

== Honours and awards ==
- 2019 – OStJ (Officer of the Venerable Order of St John)
- 2013 – MStJ (Member of the Venerable Order of St John)
- 2012 – OBE (Officer of the Order of the British Empire) For Services to the Medical field, Ornithology and to the Community on the Isle of Wight

== Personal life ==
He married F. E. Vivian Roberts in 1972. She worked as an NHS GP and a police surgeon until 2000. They have two daughters, and four grandchildren.

He has been involved in the continuing restoration of the 14th Century Haseley Manor on the Isle of Wight where they have lived since 2001, and the construction of the Roberts Nature Reserve surrounding it, which was opened by the Earl of Wessex in 2006. He also runs residential ringing courses at Haseley Manor as part of the Isle of Wight Ringing Group.

== Retirement ==
Since retiring from then NHS and the Ministry of Defence, Roberts has continued working and teaching overseas and is on a variety of charitable organisation councils.

He continued as a motor racing doctor, as an expedition doctor with the British Exploring Society and teaching doctors in England, Egypt and Southern Africa until 2022.

His other interests have been travelling, natural history, the Scouts as County Commissioner, then Chairman and now Vice President, and St John Ambulance as County President.
