= Stoke Mandeville Hospital =

Hospital in Aylesbury, Buckinghamshire, England

- Buckinghamshire Healthcare NHS Trust
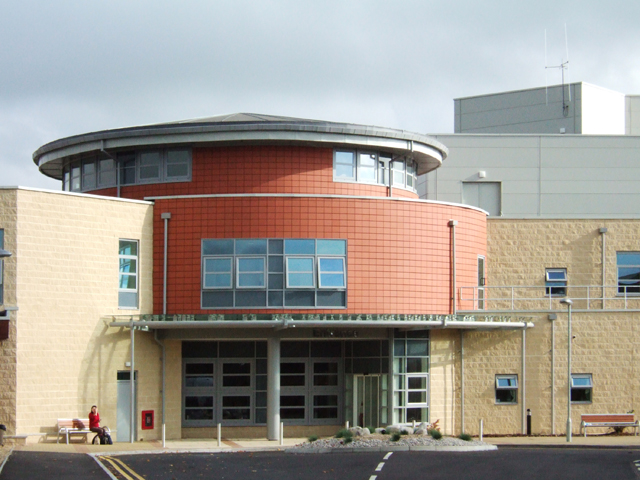
- Main entrance

- Shown in Buckinghamshire

Geography
- Location: Aylesbury, Buckinghamshire, England

Organisation
- Care system: NHS England
- Type: General

Services
- Emergency department: Yes
- Beds: 369

History
- Founded: 1832

Links
- Website: www.buckshealthcare.nhs.uk

Stoke Mandeville Hospital is a large National Health Service (NHS) hospital located on the parish borders of Aylesbury and Stoke Mandeville, Buckinghamshire, England. It is managed by Buckinghamshire Healthcare NHS Trust.

It was established in 1830 as a cholera hospital intentionally on the parish border between the neighbouring village of Stoke Mandeville and the town of Aylesbury to serve the residents of both settlements.

The hospital's National Spinal Injuries Centre is one of the largest specialist spinal units in the world, and the pioneering rehabilitation work carried out there by Sir Ludwig Guttmann, specifically the therapeutic use of competitive sport, led to the development of the Stoke Mandeville Games in 1948, the International Stoke Mandeville Games (now the World Abilitysport Games) in 1952, which in 1960 in Rome in turn became the Paralympic Games.

== History ==
=== Foundation and growth ===
In the early 1830s the village of Stoke Mandeville was badly affected by cholera epidemics that swept across England. A cholera hospital was established on the parish border between Stoke Mandeville and Aylesbury.

In September 1943 the government asked German-expatriate spinal injuries specialist Ludwig Guttmann to establish the National Spinal Injuries Centre at Stoke Mandeville Hospital. The centre opened on 1 February 1944, and Guttmann was appointed its director (a position he held until 1946). As director of the UK's first specialist unit for treating spinal injuries, he believed that sport was a major method of therapy for injured military personnel helping them build up physical strength and self-respect. Guttmann became a naturalised citizen of the United Kingdom in 1945. Guttmann organised the first Stoke Mandeville Games for disabled personnel on 28 July 1948, the same day as the start of the London 1948 Summer Olympics.

The games were held again at the same location in 1952, and Dutch World War II veterans took part alongside the British, making it the first international competition of its kind. These Stoke Mandeville Games have been described as the precursors of the Paralympic Games. The Paralympics were subsequently officialised as a quadrennial event tied to the Olympic Games, and the first Paralympic Games, no longer open solely to war veterans, were held in Rome in 1960.

After the hospital joined the National Health Service in 1948, it sought to establish the Stoke Mandeville Stadium which was opened by Queen Elizabeth II in 1969.

The hospital was visited by Diana, Princess of Wales who opened the new International Spinal Injuries Centre when it was refurbished in August 1983.

=== 21st century ===
A redevelopment scheme over much of the site was procured under a Private Finance Initiative contract in 2004. The construction work was carried out by Alfred McAlpine at a cost of £47 million and completed in 2006. Sodexo was contracted to carry out the facilities management services on the site. A new maternity unit was opened in 2009.

Mandeville, one of the official mascots for the 2012 Summer Olympics and Paralympics in London, was named in honour of the hospital's contribution to Paralympic sports.

== Historic sexual abuse at the hospital ==
The joint Metropolitan Police Service and National Society for the Prevention of Cruelty to Children report of the investigations into sexual abuse committed by disc jockey Jimmy Savile found that Savile, who was a valued fundraiser for the institution (including raising money for the Spinal Injuries Unit), committed offences there between 1965 and 1988. Twenty-two offences there between those dates have been formally recorded as crimes by the police. A former child patient at the hospital has said that nurses warned her to stay in bed and pretend to be asleep when Savile was due to visit.

Michael Salmon, consultant paediatrician at Stoke Mandeville hospital, was convicted and jailed for three years in 1990 for indecent assaults on teenaged girl patients, two thirteen-year-olds and one sixteen-year-old girl. In the aftermath of the Savile scandal, Salmon was also arrested as part of Operation Yewtree on 17 December 2013. He was subsequently convicted of nine indecent assaults and two rapes, with victims' ages ranging from eleven to eighteen and having occurred between 1973 and 1988 and was sentenced to 18 years in prison. Despite working at the hospital at the same time as Savile, there is no known link between the two. Salmon was also convicted of 14 charges in December 2016 and received an additional sentence of four years in prison.

Independent investigator Androulla Johnstone published a report on Savile's activities at the hospital on 26 February 2015. The report found that he had sexually abused more than 50 people there, including staff, patients and visitors; one was an eight-year-old child. Savile had full access to all parts of the hospital. The report stated that it was widely known at the hospital that Savile was a "sex pest", and that 10 complaints had been made at the time, but no action was taken. The report also found that three doctors, including Salmon, had been convicted of sex crimes against their patients in the preceding four decades.

== Criticism ==
On 27 February 2013, Buckinghamshire disability charity BuDS announced that it was compiling a dossier of evidence about risks to patient safety at Stoke Mandeville hospital to send to the Care Quality Commission. The charity claimed that it had received "alarming reports from various sources ... expressing serious concerns about patient safety at the hospital".

Bucks Healthcare NHS Trust responded by saying "it was 'somewhat irresponsible of BuDS to potentially worry patients by hinting at patient safety issues at the hospital". The charity, however, defended its action and said "BuDS wanted to give staff, patients and visitors at Stoke Mandeville hospital a wholly anonymous way to report any concerns they might have".

On 20 April 2013 the CQC published a report after an unannounced inspection at the hospital. It found that the hospital did not meet the standards for staffing levels and for providing support to staff. Enforcement action was taken regarding supporting staff and a warning notice was served.

== Facilities ==
The facilities at the hospital include:

Ward Number/Name	Speciality
1	Trauma and Orthopaedic
2	Trauma and Orthopaedic
3	Paediatrics
4	Respiratory & General Medicine
5	Haematology & General Medicine
6	Endocrinology & General Medicine
7	Respiratory & General Medicine
8	Medicine for older people
9	Therapy & Nurse Lead Unit (TNLU)
10	Short stay ward
11	Burns and Plastic Surgery
15	Surgical admissions unit
16 A	General Surgery, Plastic Surgery
16 B	General Surgery, Plastic Surgery
17	Gastroenterology & General Medicine
AMU	Acute Medical Unit
EOU	Emergency Observation Unit
St Joseph's	Medical Day Unit, Discharge lounge, overflow
Eye ward	Ophthalmology and overflow

=== Transport links ===
The hospital is served by the London to Aylesbury Line and the Princes Risborough to Aylesbury Line from Aylesbury railway station. There are bus services connecting the hospital with Aylesbury and High Wycombe run by Arriva and also with Leighton Buzzard.

== Stoke Mandeville Hospital Radio ==
Stoke Mandeville Hospital Radio
- England
- Broadcast area: Stoke Mandeville Hospital
- Frequencies: Current: FM (FM): 101.8 MHz; Online streaming; Dedicated app; Former: AM (MW): 1575 kHz

Programming
- Format: Hospital

History
- First air date: 7:30pm 4 December 1978

Links
- Website: www.smhr.co.uk

Stoke Mandeville Hospital Radio (SMHR) is a non-profit hospital radio station which was founded on 4 December 1978. It is located within the hospital complex and provides a 24-hour radio service to the patients and staff streaming its service online, on 101.8MHz (FM) and through the use of their mobile device app, SMHR which was released in 2015.

The first broadcast was on 4 December 1978 at 7:30pm. The first sentence was: 'Good evening and welcome to Stoke Mandeville Hospital's very own radio station'."

In 1997, it was one of two hospital radio stations in the UK (the other being Radio Tyneside) to be awarded a temporary AM broadcasting licence from the Radio Authority (became Ofcom in 2003) as part of a pioneering trial as per the then recent passed Broadcasting Act. The success of the experiment led to the station, along with Tyneside Radio and many others, gaining a permanent broadcasting licence.

In 2018, former mayor of Aylesbury and long-standing patron and co-founder of the station, Freda Roberts MBE JP stood down as patron, being replaced by Radio 2 presenter Ken Bruce. Ken said "Hospital Radio continues to thrive and I am delighted to take on the role of patron."

The station is a volunteer-run not-for-profit charity and has live request shows every weekday from 8pm till 10pm.

On 24 May 2019, SMHR was granted an FM broadcasting licence at 87.7 MHz by the industry regulator Ofcom. The move was linked to Local Radio day, in which the station celebrated with a six-hour live broadcast from the Royal Voluntary Services Café in the hospital.

== Notable people ==
=== Patients ===
Olivia Dahl, daughter of Roald Dahl and Patricia Neal, died there on 17 November 1962.

British entertainer and actor Nicholas Parsons, best known for hosting Just a Minute and Sale of the Century died there on 28 January 2020.

=== Staff ===
Anthony Roberts, surgeon best known for operating on military personnel in theatres of war.

== See also ==
- List of hospitals in England
- 2012 Summer Olympics and Paralympics gold post boxes
