= Ingalls Memorial Hospital =

Hospital in Illinois, United States

Coordinates: 41.607251°N 87.659603°W

Ingalls Memorial Hospital is a general medical and surgical hospital located in Harvey, Illinois, a south suburb of Chicago, Illinois. Ingalls is a secular establishment. In 2016, Ingalls completed a merger with the University of Chicago Medicine. Ingalls retains its own board and president but its corporate parent is now UChicago Medicine. Ingalls Memorial Hospital is now known as UChicago Medicine Ingalls Memorial.

== Locations ==
Ingalls main 37 acres (15 ha) campus is located at One Ingalls Drive, Harvey, IL 60426, USA. Ingalls has additional facilities of varying sizes and capabilities all located in the southern suburbs of Chicago.

- Ingalls Family Care Center, Calumet City, Illinois
- Ingalls Family Care Center, Tinley Park, Illinois
- Ingalls Family Care Center, Flossmoor, Illinois
- Ingalls Care Center, Crestwood, Illinois
- Ingalls Care Center, South Holland, Illinois

== Size ==
- Licensed for approximately 582 beds.
- Approximately 3000 employees.

== Activity during 2003-2004 ==
- Admissions: 19,647
- Inpatient surgeries: 3,561
- Outpatient visits: 247,218
- Outpatient surgeries: 3,605
- Emergency room visits: 37,859
- Births: 1,582

== Memberships and awards ==
- 41st in Digestive disorders
- 36th in neurology and neurosurgery
- Joint Commission on Accreditation of Healthcare Organizations (JCAHO)
- Commission on Accreditation of Rehabilitation Facilities (CARF)

== See also ==
- Rumination syndrome
- Digestive Disorders Foundation
