= Tony Roberts (poet) =

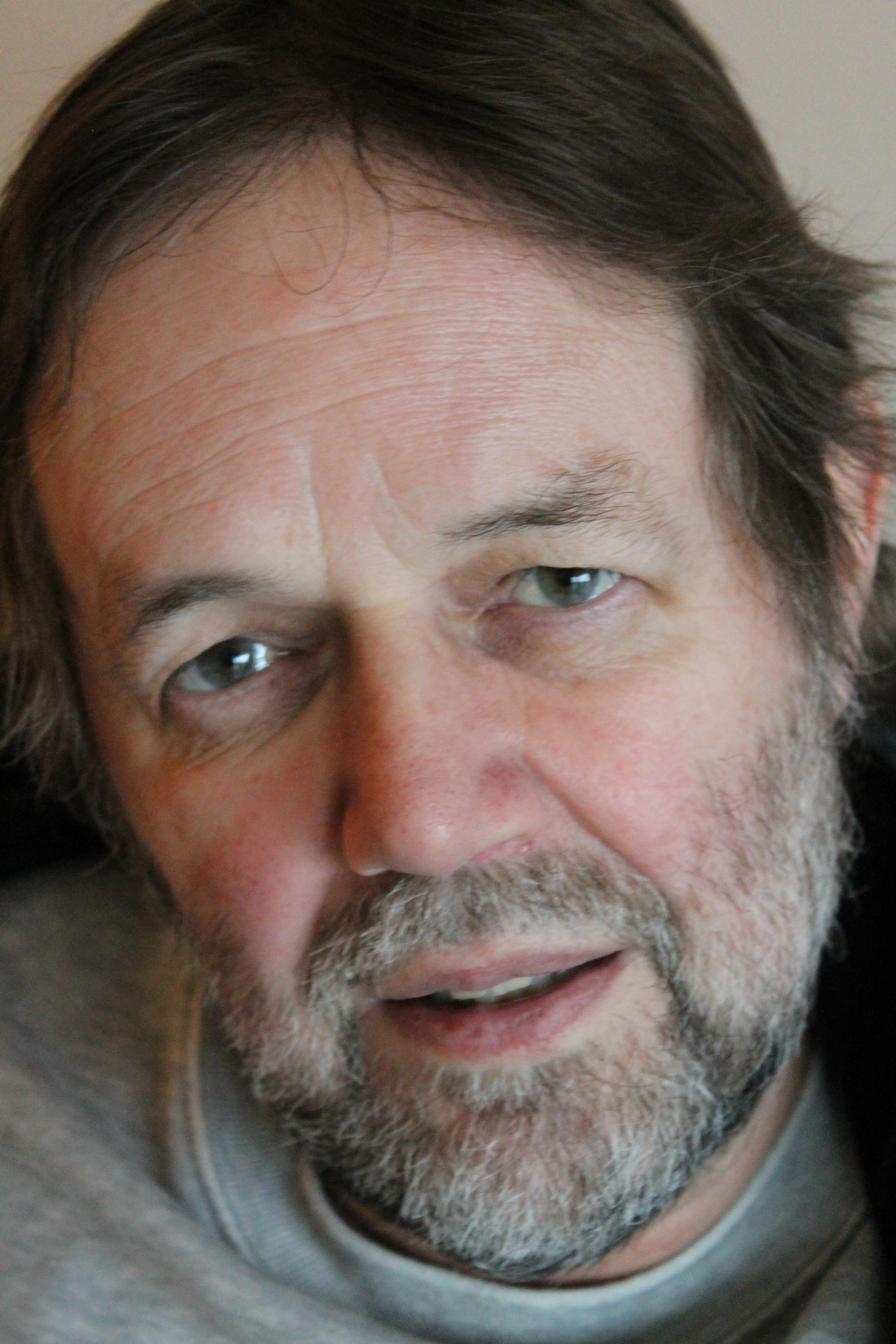

Tony Roberts (born 1949) is a contemporary English poet and critic.

== Biography ==
Roberts was born in Doncaster. He was educated at the then Didsbury College and, on a Drapers’ Company of London Scholarship, at The College of William and Mary in Virginia, where he completed an M.A. in literature. After teaching in Williamsburg he returned to Manchester and taught in Bolton schools for over thirty years, before taking early retirement to focus on his writing.

Roberts's poetry has appeared in a wide variety of magazines, including 'Agenda', ‘Encounter’, 'P.N.Review', ‘Poetry Review’, ‘The Spectator’, ‘Stand’ and ‘The Southern Review’. A poem from his Drawndark collection appeared as the Saturday poem in ‘The Guardian’ in 2015. Other poems of his have won prizes in poetry competitions over the years and his work appeared in the anthologies Accompanied Voices (2015), and Strike Up The Band (2017). Al Alvarez has described Roberts's poetry as having ‘an authentic adult voice, tender, ironic, relaxed and highly educated’.

Reviewing Drawndark in 'The Sewanee Review' (Summer 2016), Michael Mott wrote of Roberts's 'important collection': 'The "nightly little ceremonies" of the title poem are delightful. So are the other domestic celebrations of the collection...Those who have discovered Tony Roberts's "Noir Americain" will be glad to learn that he appears in three episodes...Each is carried off with great skill, courage, and panache, and the last is very funny.' Award-winning American poet Michael Waters wrote of The Noir American & Other Poems: ‘Muscular, allusive, clever, cinematic, and richly musical…these poems capture jazz life as well as anyone could.’

Roberts's critical prose appears regularly in such magazines as ‘P. N. Review’, ‘Agenda’, ‘The London Magazine’, ‘New Walk’, ‘Stand’ and ‘The Warwick Review’. He is particularly interested in American subjects. John Forth wrote of the method in Roberts's essay collection, The Taste in My Mind, ‘a detailed map of the age is condensed to appear as table-talk. You invite him to dinner and his friends talk easily into the night after everyone else has gone.’ Roberts has also edited a selection of essays to celebrate 20 years of Shoestring Press, Poetry in the Blood.

== Bibliography ==
=== Poetry ===
- Chambers, Harry, ed. (1988). Peterloo Preview : volume 1. Peterloo Poets.
- Flowers of the Hudson Bay (Peterloo Poets, 1991)
- Sitters (Arc Publications, 2002)
- Outsiders (Shoestring Press, 2010)
- Drawndark (Shoestring Press, 2014)
- The Noir American & Other Poems (Shoestring Press, 2018)

=== Non fiction ===
- Poetry in the Blood (Shoestring Press, 2014)
- The Taste in My Mind: Essays & Reviews (Shoestring Press, 2015)
- The Taste of My Mornings: Essays on Poets, Critics & America (Shoestring Press, 2019)
- A Movement of Mind: Essays on Poets, Critics & Biographers (Shoestring Press, 2024)
