= Surfer's myelopathy =

Spinal cord injury

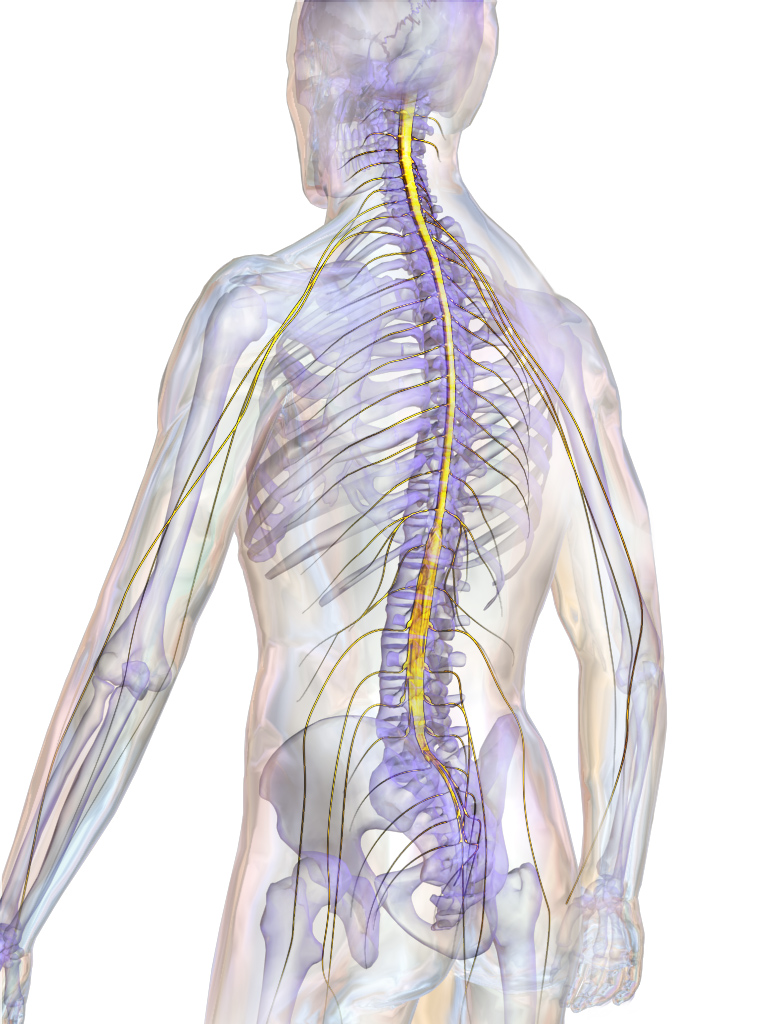
- Spinal cord
- Specialty: Neurology

Surfer's myelopathy is a rare, nontraumatic spinal cord injury caused by hyperextension of the back and resulting in paraplegia (paralysis below the waist). During hyperextension, a blood vessel leading to the spine, such as the anterior spinal artery, can become kinked, depriving the spinal cord of oxygen. Although the condition derives its name from the fact that the phenomenon is most often seen in those surfing for the first time, it can be caused by any activity in which the back is hyperextended (yoga, pilates, etc.). In some cases, the paralysis is permanent.

Recommendations for prevention of myelopathy include proper warm-up, limiting session length, and sitting rather than lying on the board while waiting for waves.

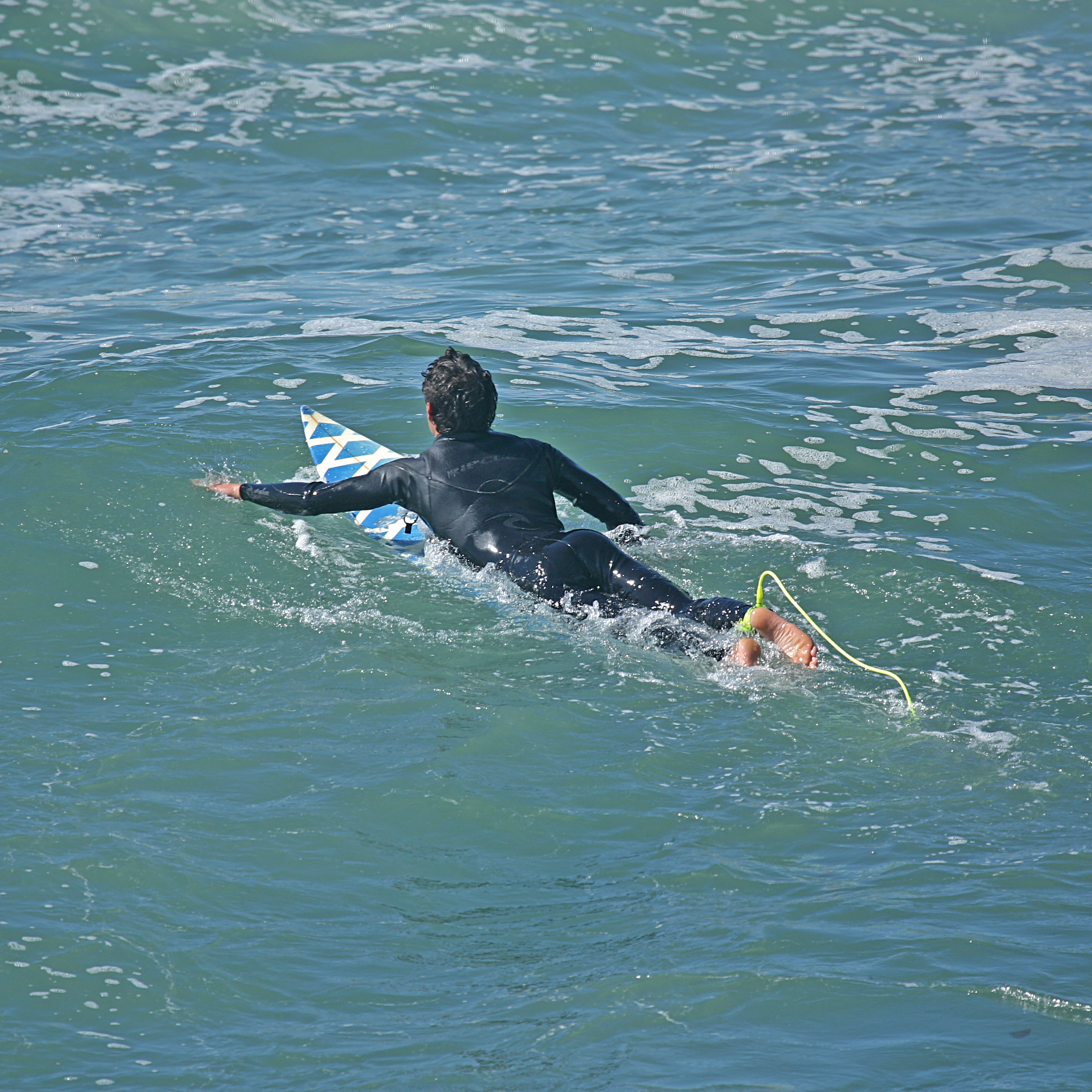
A surfer paddling.

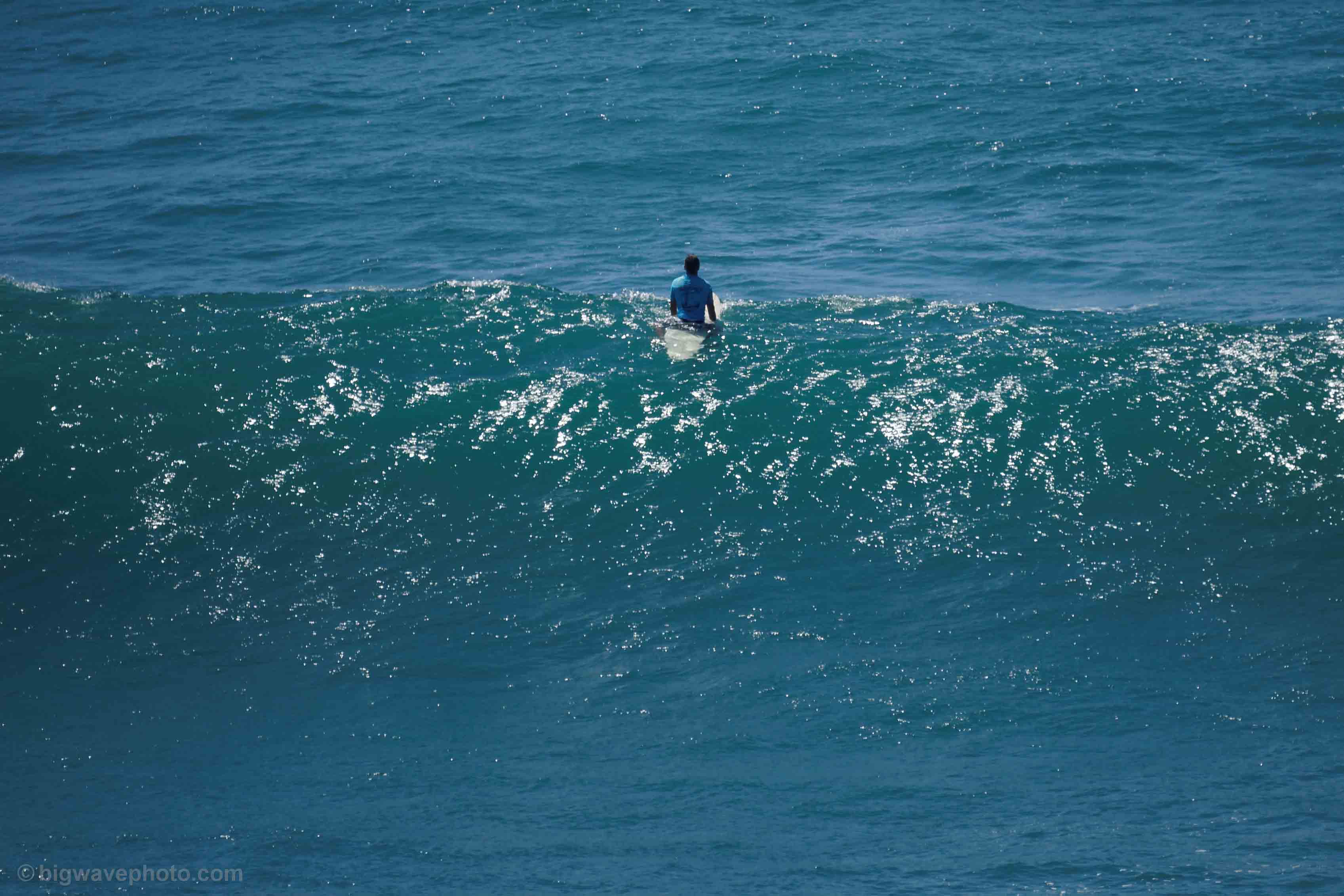
Surfer sitting on his board, thereby resting his back.

== History ==
In a 2012 case series of nineteen novice surfers with nontraumatic myelopathy was published in 2012, all patients' MRI scans showed hyperintensity from the lower thoracic spinal cord to the conus medullaris. An additional study of twenty-three cases was published in 2013.

== See also ==
- Rehabilitation in spinal cord injury
