= American Spinal Injury Association =

Muscle strength score
Grade	Muscle function
0	No muscle contraction
1	Muscle flickers
2	Full range of motion with gravity eliminated
3	Full range of motion against gravity
4	Full range of motion against resistance
5	Normal strength

The American Spinal Injury Association (ASIA), formed in 1973, publishes the International Standards for Neurological Classification of Spinal Cord Injury (ISNCSCI), which is a neurological exam widely used to document sensory and motor impairments following spinal cord injury (SCI). The ASIA assessment is the gold standard for assessing SCI. ASIA is one of the affiliated societies of the International Spinal Cord Society.

The exam is based on neurological responses, touch and pinprick sensations tested in each dermatome, and strength of the muscles that control key motions on both sides of the body. Muscle strength is scored on a scale of 0–5 according to the adjacent table, and sensation is graded on a scale of 0–2: 0 is no sensation, 1 is altered or decreased sensation, and 2 is full sensation. Each side of the body is graded independently. When an area is not available (e.g. because of an amputation or cast), it is recorded as "NT", "not testable". The ISNCSCI exam is used for determining the neurological level of injury (the lowest area of full, uninterrupted sensation and function).

The completeness or incompleteness of the injury is measured by the ASIA Impairment Scale (AIS).

ASIA Impairment Scale for classifying spinal cord injury
Grade	Description
A	Complete injury. No motor or sensory function is preserved in the sacral segments S4 or S5.
B	Sensory incomplete. Sensory but not motor function is preserved below the level of injury, including the sacral segments.
C	Motor incomplete. Motor function is preserved below the level of injury, and more than half of muscles tested below the level of injury have a muscle grade less than 3 (see muscle strength scores table).
D	Motor incomplete. Motor function is preserved below the level of injury and at least half of the key muscles below the neurological level have a muscle grade of 3 or more.
E	Normal. No motor or sensory deficits, but deficits existed in the past.

== History ==
Until the development of the Frankel grade classification (FGC) in 1969, there was no universally accepted grading system for SCI. Frankel and his team developed a classification system with five grades, labeled A through E, to assess the severity of neurological impairments following a traumatic SCI.

In 1982, the Standards Committee of ASIA revised and published the first edition of the "Standards for Neurologic Classification of Spinal Cord Injury," based on the modified version of the FGC.

== Bibliography ==
- Dimitrijevic, Milan R.; Kakulas, Byron A.; McKay, W. Barry; Vrbová, Gerta, eds. (12 January 2012). Restorative Neurology of Spinal Cord Injury. Oxford University Press, USA. ISBN 978-0-19-974650-7.
- Harvey L (2008). Management of Spinal Cord Injuries: A Guide for Physiotherapists. Elsevier Health Sciences. ISBN 978-0-443-06858-4.
- Teufack S, Harrop JS, Ashwini DS (29 October 2012). "Spinal Cord Injury Classification". In Fehlings MG, Vaccaro AR, Maxwell B (eds.). Essentials of Spinal Cord Injury: Basic Research to Clinical Practice. Thieme. ISBN 978-1-60406-727-9.
- Weiss, J.M. (15 March 2010). "Spinal cord injury". In Weiss, L.D.; Weiss, J.M.; Pobre, T. (eds.). Oxford American Handbook of Physical Medicine and Rehabilitation. Oxford University Press, USA. ISBN 978-0-19-970999-1.
