= Ludwig Guttmann =

German-Polish neurologist (1899–1980)

Sir Ludwig Guttmann CBE FRS
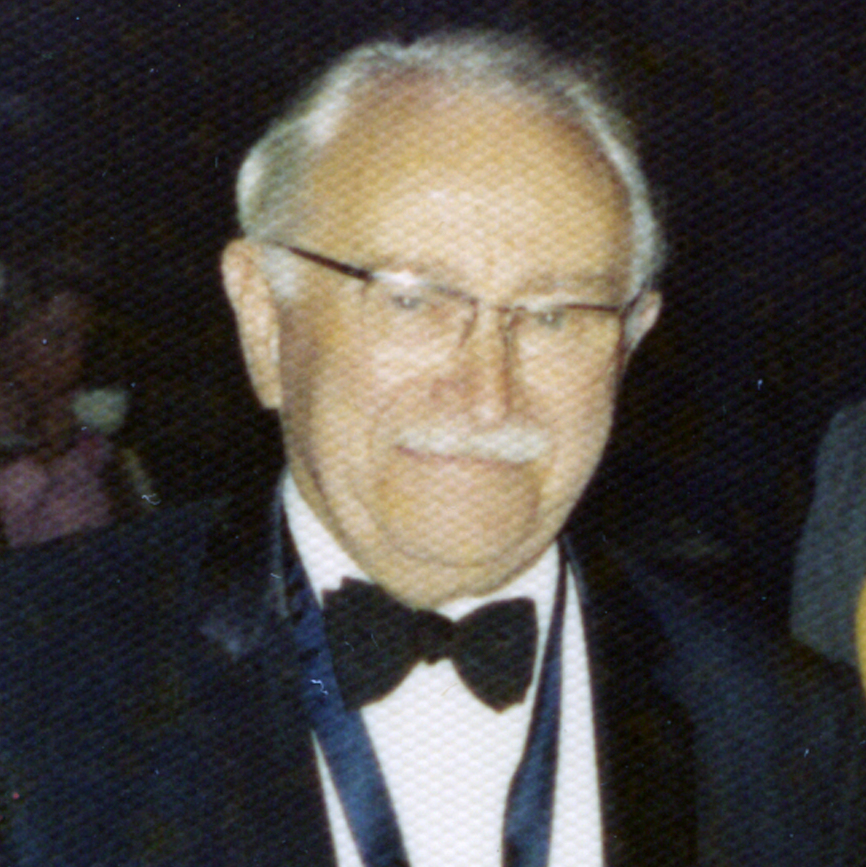
- Guttmann in 1976
- Born: 3 July 1899; Tost, Prussia, German Empire (now Toszek, Poland)
- Died: 18 March 1980 (aged 80); Aylesbury, Buckinghamshire, United Kingdom
- Citizenship: Germany, United Kingdom
- Known for: Founding the Paralympic Games
- Medical career
- Profession: Neurologist
- Awards: Fellow of the Royal Society

Sir Ludwig Guttmann CBE FRS (3 July 1899 – 18 March 1980) was a German-British neurologist who established the Stoke Mandeville Games, the sporting event for people with disabilities (PWD) that evolved in England into the Paralympic Games. A Jewish doctor who fled Nazi Germany just before the start of the Second World War, Guttmann was a founding father of organized physical activities for people with disabilities.

== Early life ==
Ludwig Guttmann was born on 3 July 1899 to a German Jewish family, in the town of Tost, Upper Silesia, in the former German Empire (now Toszek in southern Poland), the son of Dorothy (née Weissenberg) and Bernard Guttmann, a distiller. When Guttmann was three years old, the family moved to the Silesian city of Königshütte (today Chorzów, Poland).

In 1917, while volunteering at an accident hospital in Königshütte, he encountered his first paraplegic patient, a coal miner with a spinal fracture who later died of sepsis. That same year, Guttmann passed his Abitur at the humanistic grammar school in Königshütte before being called up for military service.

Guttmann started his medical studies in April 1918 at the University of Breslau. He transferred to the University of Freiburg in 1919 and received his Doctorate of Medicine in 1924.

== Escape to Britain ==
By 1933, Guttmann was working in Breslau (now Wrocław, Poland) as a neurosurgeon and lecturing at the university. He learned from the pioneer of neurosurgery, Otfrid Foerster, at his research institute. Despite having worked successfully as first assistant to Foerster, Guttmann was expelled from his university appointment and his job in 1933 under the Nuremberg Laws, and his title was changed to Krankenbehandler (one who treats the sick). With the arrival of the Nazis in power, Jews were banned from practising medicine professionally; Guttmann was assigned to work at the Breslau Jewish Hospital, where he became medical director in 1937. Following the violent attacks on Jewish people and properties during Kristallnacht on 9 November 1938, Guttmann ordered his staff to admit any patients without question. The following day, he justified his decision on a case-by-case basis with the Gestapo. Out of 64 admissions, 60 patients were saved from arrest and deportation to concentration camps.

In early 1939, Guttmann and his family left Germany because of the Nazi persecution of the Jews. An opportunity for escape had come when the Nazis provided him with a visa and ordered him to travel to Portugal to treat a friend of the Portuguese dictator António de Oliveira Salazar. Guttmann was scheduled to return to Germany via London, when the Council for Assisting Refugee Academics (CARA) arranged for him to remain in the United Kingdom. He arrived in Oxford, England, on 14 March 1939 with his wife, Else Samuel Guttmann, and their two children: a son, Dennis, and a daughter, Eva, aged six. CARA negotiated with the British Home Office on their behalf, and gave Guttmann and his family £250 (equivalent to £14,000 in 2025) to help settle in Oxford.

Guttmann continued his spinal injury research at the Nuffield Department of Neurosurgery in the Radcliffe Infirmary. For the first few weeks after arrival the family resided in the Master's Lodge of Balliol College (with the Master Sandie Lindsay) until they moved into a small semi-detached house in Lonsdale Road. Both children were offered free places by the headmistress of Greycotes School. The family were members of the Oxford Jewish community, and Eva remembers becoming friendly with Miriam Margolyes, now a famous actress. The Jewish community in Oxford was growing rapidly as a result of the influx of displaced academic Jews from Europe.

With the outbreak of the Second World War, Guttmann and his family stayed in the home of Lord Lindsay, CARA Councillor and Master of Balliol College.

== Stoke Mandeville and Paralympic Games ==
In September 1943, the British government asked Guttmann to establish the National Spinal Injuries Centre at Stoke Mandeville Hospital in Buckinghamshire. The initiative came from the Royal Air Force to improve the treatment and rehabilitation of pilots with spine injuries, "who often crashed on approach with their bombers damaged". When the centre opened on 1 February 1944, the United Kingdom's first specialist unit for treating spinal injuries, Guttmann was appointed its director (a position he held until 1966). He believed that sport was an important method of therapy for the rehabilitation of injured military personnel, helping them build up physical strength and self-respect.

Guttmann became a naturalised British citizen in 1945. He organised the first Stoke Mandeville Games for disabled war veterans, which was held at the hospital on 29 July 1948, the same day as the opening of the London Olympics. All participants had spinal cord injuries and competed in wheelchairs. In an effort to encourage his patients to take part in national events, Guttmann used the term Paraplegic Games. These came to be known as the "Paralympic Games", which grew to include other disabilities.

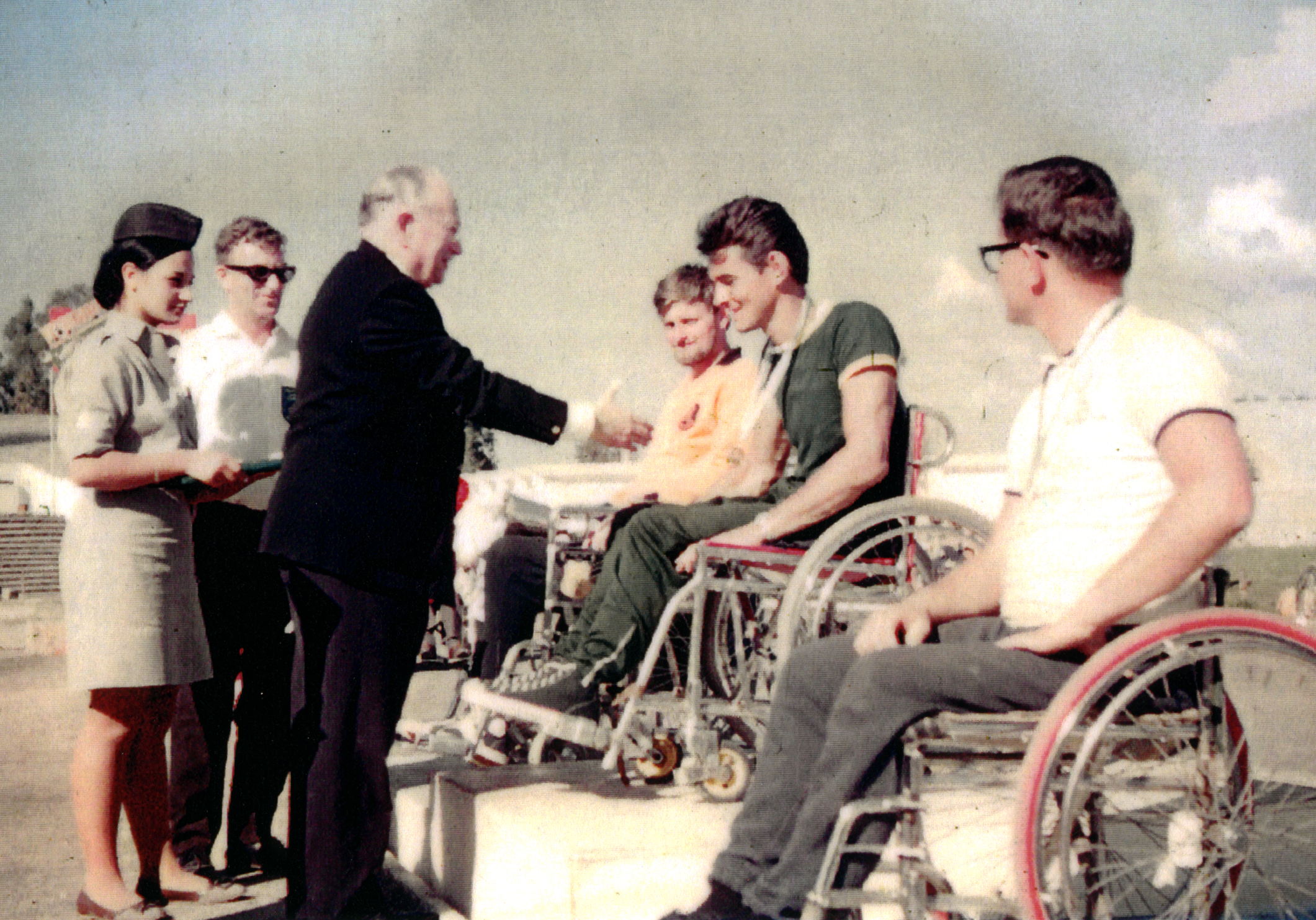
Guttmann presenting gold medal to Tony South at the 1968 Summer Paralympics in Tel Aviv

By 1952, more than 130 international competitors had entered the Stoke Mandeville Games. As the annual event continued to grow, the ethos and efforts by all those involved started to impress the organisers of the Olympic Games and members of the international community. At the 1956 Stoke Mandeville Games, Guttmann was awarded the Sir Thomas Fearnley Cup by the International Olympic Committee (IOC) for his meritorious achievement in service to the Olympic movement through the social and human value derived from wheelchair sports.

His vision of an international games, the equivalent of the Olympic Games themselves, was realised in 1960 when the International Stoke Mandeville Games were held alongside the official 1960 Summer Olympics in Rome. Known at the time as the 9th Annual International Stoke Mandeville Games, and organised with the support of the World Federation of Ex-servicemen (an International Working Group on Sport for the Disabled), they are now recognised as the first Paralympic Games. (The term "Paralympic Games" was retroactively applied by the IOC in 1984.)

In 1961, Guttmann founded the British Sports Association for the Disabled, which would later become known as the English Federation of Disability Sport.

== Later life ==
Guttmann was appointed Officer of the Order of the British Empire (OBE) in the 1950 King's Birthday Honours, as "Neurological Surgeon in charge of the Spinal Injuries Centre at the Ministry of Pensions Hospital, Stoke Mandeville". On 28 June 1957, he was made an Associate Officer of the Venerable Order of Saint John.

He was promoted to Commander of the Order of the British Empire (CBE) in 1960, and he was knighted by Queen Elizabeth II in 1966.

In 1961, Guttmann founded the International Medical Society of Paraplegia, now the International Spinal Cord Society (ISCoS); he was the inaugural president of the society, a position that he held until 1970. He became the first editor of the journal Paraplegia (now named Spinal Cord). He retired from clinical work in 1966 but continued his involvement with sport.

Guttmann had a heart attack in October 1979, and died on 18 March 1980 at the age of 80. He is buried at the Bushey Jewish Cemetery, about 23 kilometres (14 mi) NW of London.

== Legacy ==
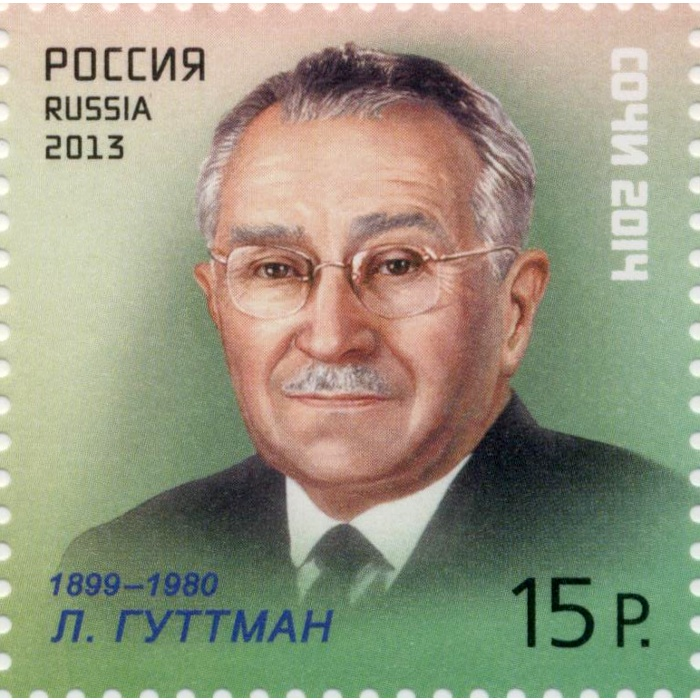
Guttmann on a 2013 Russian stamp from the series "Sports Legends"

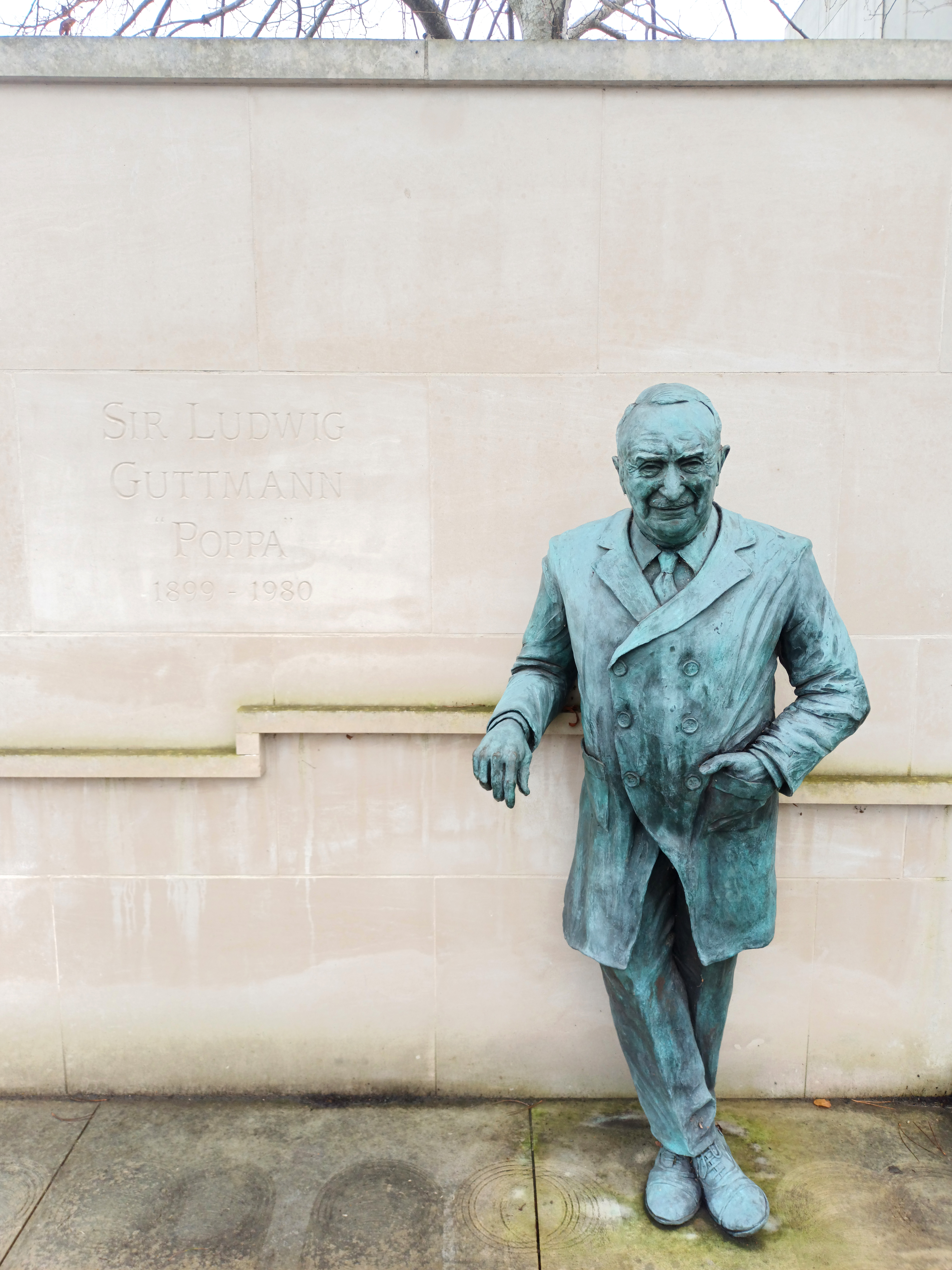
Ludwig Guttmann Statue, Stoke Mandeville, 2025

Stoke Mandeville Stadium, the National Centre for Disability Sport in the United Kingdom, was developed by him alongside the hospital. A specialist neurorehabilitation hospital in Barcelona, the Institut Guttmann, is named in his honour. In June 2012, a life-sized cast-bronze statue of Guttmann was unveiled at Stoke Mandeville Stadium as part of the run-up to the London 2012 Summer Paralympics and Olympic Games. After the Games, it was moved to its permanent home at the National Spinal Injuries Centre. Guttmann's daughter, Eva Loeffler, was appointed the mayor of the London 2012 Paralympic Games athletes' village. The Sir Ludwig Guttmann Health and Wellbeing Centre is a health centre named in his honour in East Village, London, on the site of the 2012 Olympic and Paralympic village.

In August 2012, the BBC broadcast The Best of Men, a TV film about Guttmann's work at Stoke Mandeville during and after the Second World War. The film, written by Lucy Gannon, starred Eddie Marsan as Dr. Guttmann and Rob Brydon as one of the seriously injured patients, who were given a purpose in life by the doctor.

The Sir Ludwig Guttmann Lectureship was established by the International Medical Society of Paraplegia (now ISCoS) to recognize Guttmann's pioneering work and lifelong contribution to spinal cord care. The Ludwig Guttmann Prize of the German Medical Society for Paraplegia is awarded for "excellent scientific work in the field of clinical research on spinal cord injury".

On 24 October 2013, a commemorative plaque was unveiled by the Association of Jewish Refugees (AJR) at the National Spinal Injuries Centre to celebrate Guttmann's life and work. As an active member of the AJR, he had served on the board for more than 25 years. In 2019 the National Paralympic Heritage Centre, a small accessible museum, was opened at Stoke Mandeville Stadium celebrating the birthplace of the Paralympics, sharing the collections of the early Paralympic Movement and the central role played by Professor Sir Ludwig Guttmann.

On 3 July 2021, a Google Doodle of Guttmann was featured on the Google homepage for Guttmann's 122nd birthday. A statue of Guttman at the Stoke Mandeville Hospital was added to the Buckinghamshire's protected Local Heritage List in 2024.

== Selected publications ==
- 1959. The Place of Our Spinal Paraplegic Fellow-Man in Society: A Survey on 2000 Patients. Dame Georgina Buller Memorial Lecture.
- 1973. Spinal Cord Injuries: Comprehensive Management and Research. Blackwell Science. ISBN 978-0-632-09680-0.
- 1973. "Sport and Recreation for the Mentally and Physically Handicapped" in The Journal of the Royal Society for the Promotion of Health. 1973; 93(4): 208–21, PMID 4276814.
- 1976. Textbook of Sport for the Disabled. Aylesbury: HM+M. ISBN 978-0-85602-055-1.
