= Anthony Roberts (cricketer) =

South African cricketer (born 1962)

Personal information
- Born: 27 March 1962 (age 64); Port Elizabeth, South Africa
- Source: Cricinfo, 12 December 2020

Anthony Roberts (born 27 March 1962) is a South African cricketer. He played in six first-class and two List A matches from 1985/86 to 1990/91.
