= University of Chicago Medical Center =

Teaching hospital in Chicago, Illinois

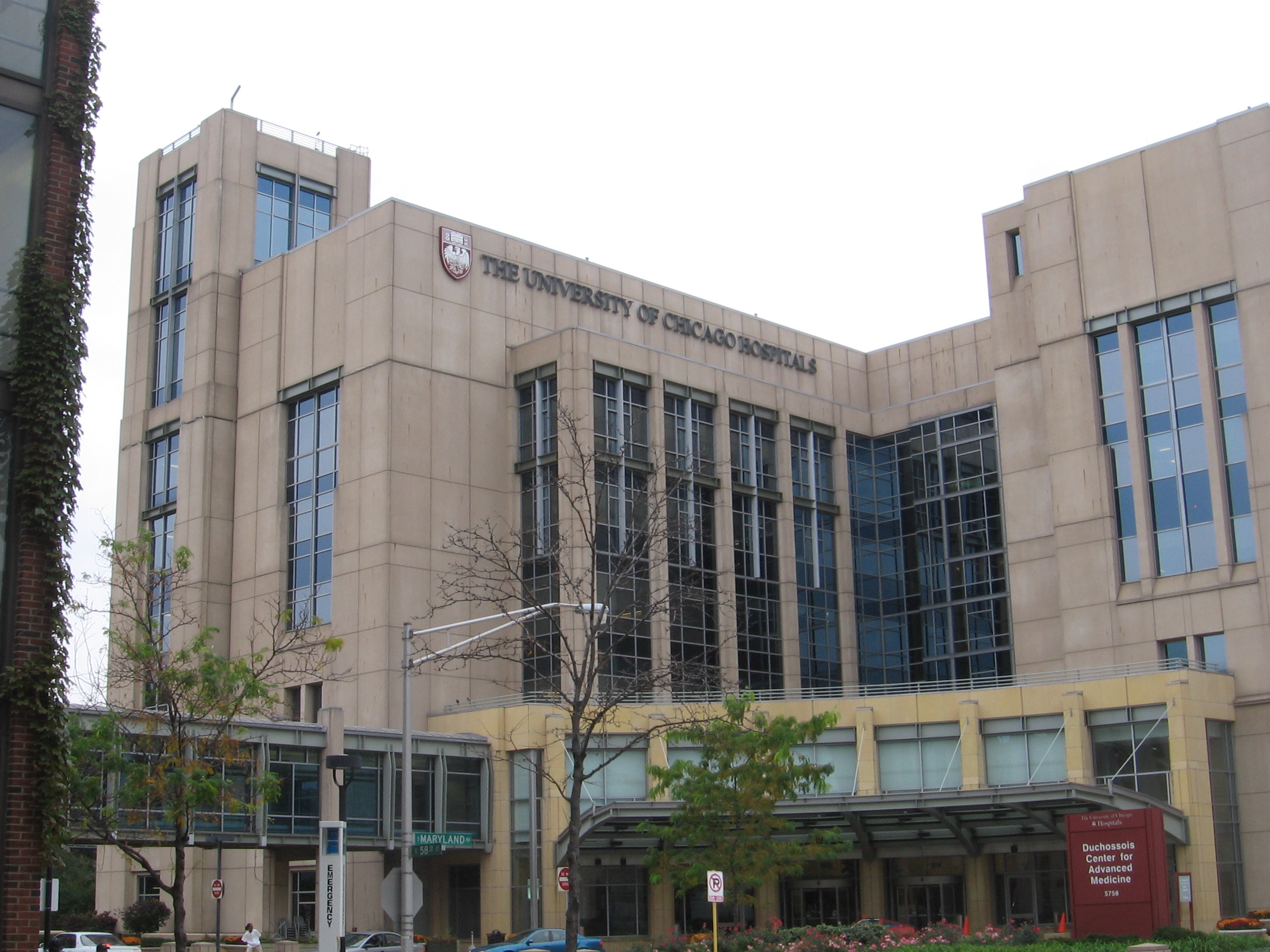
- Duchossois Center for Advanced Medicine

Geography
- Location: Hyde Park, South Side of Chicago, Illinois, United States
- Coordinates: 41°47′30″N 87°36′19″W

Organization
- Type: Inpatient and outpatient, specialty and primary care, teaching
- Affiliated university: University of Chicago; Pritzker School of Medicine

Services
- Emergency department: Level I Adult Trauma Center / Level I Pediatric Trauma Center
- Beds: 811

Helipads
- Helipad: FAA LID: 4IS3
Number	Length		Surface
Number	ft	m	Surface
H1	38 x 30	12 x 9	pierced steel planking
H2	50 x 50	15 x 15	mats

History
- Founded: 1898

Links
- Website: uchicagomedicine.org
- Lists: Hospitals in Illinois

The University of Chicago Medical Center is a nationally ranked academic medical center located in Hyde Park on the South Side of Chicago. It is the flagship campus for The University of Chicago Medicine system and was established in 1898. Affiliated with and located on the University of Chicago campus, it also serves as the teaching hospital for Pritzker School of Medicine. Primary medical facilities on campus include the Center for Care and Discovery, Bernard A. Mitchell Hospital, and Comer Children's Hospital.

== History ==
The University of Chicago Medicine and Biological Sciences, is an academic medical institution founded as part of the University of Chicago Medicine and Biological Sciences in 1927 when it first opened to patients. Opening in the fall of that year, the building comprised the Abbott Memorial Hall and the Albert Merritt Billings Hospital, a 215-bed facility.

Since its inception, University of Chicago Medicine has been home to numerous landmark discoveries in biomedical science. In the 1960s, researchers at the University of Chicago were among the first to characterize proinsulin, the precursor molecule to insulin, providing key insights into hormone biosynthesis and diabetes. In the 1970s, Eugene Goldwasser, a biochemist at the university, identified erythropoietin, the hormone responsible for regulating red blood cell production. After sharing the small quantities he had isolated with researchers at Amgen, the hormone was later mass-produced using recombinant DNA technology and became a widely used treatment for anemia. The institution has also made foundational contributions to cancer biology and treatment, including the demonstration by Charles Huggins that prostate cancer is hormonally driven, work that earned the Nobel Prize, and the identification by Janet Rowley of chromosomal translocations in leukemia, establishing the genetic basis of cancer and paving the way for targeted therapies. In addition, modern sleep science traces important roots to the university through the work of Nathaniel Kleitman, who, along with his student Eugene Aserinsky, first identified rapid eye movement (REM) sleep in 1953 using electroencephalography. Peter Huttenlocher, who joined the faculty in 1974, was the first to systematically describe how synaptic connections in the developing brain are overproduced in early childhood and then selectively “pruned,” fundamentally shaping modern understanding of neuroplasticity.

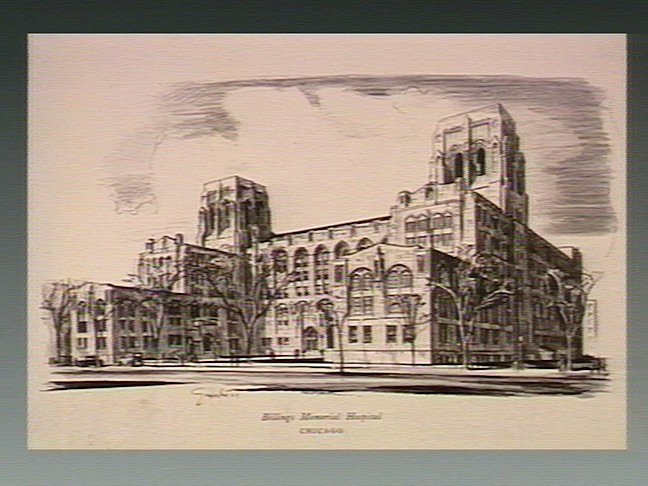
Photomechanical print of the Albert Merritt Billings Memorial Hospital, Chicago, by G. Haln. October 1929

In 1988, The University of Chicago Medicine decided to close its adult trauma center. At the time, the decision was made because the trauma center was losing a large amount of money and taking away resources from other specialties.

Between 2005 and 2009, Michelle Obama served as vice-president for Community and External Affairs, while her husband Barack Obama was serving as a U.S. Senator from Illinois. Obama resigned the position in 2009, as her husband became president-elect and the family prepared their move to the White House.

A campaign for a new adult level 1 trauma center surfaced after the death of Damian Turner, an 18-year-old who was killed by gunshot in August 2010. Hospital representatives have said that building an adult trauma center would compromise the other distinct and critically important services for the community, such as The South Side's only level 1 trauma center for children, the South Side's only burn unit, its emergency departments for adults and children and the neonatal intensive care unit. Protesters have suggested that The University of Chicago should not be seeking financial support to attract the presidential library of Barack Obama without first committing to reopening an adult trauma facility.

The Center for Care and Discovery (CCD) opened in 2013 and to date serves as the flagship hospital for UChicago Medicine. The 10-story facility has 436 beds in all private rooms, 52 intensive care beds, 9 suites for advanced imaging and interventional procedures and 23 operating rooms designed to accommodate hybrid and robotic procedures.

In December 2015, the university announced that it would be restarting the level 1 adult trauma center at the hospital. Furthermore, the university announced plans to expand The University of Chicago Medical Center. The center now includes 188 additional beds and has increased the hospital to its biggest size since the 1970s. The expansion was in response to an increased demand for bed space, as the medical center had been operating near capacity.

On December 29, 2017, a new adult emergency room connected to the Center for Care and Discovery opened for patient care. On May 1, 2018, the new Level 1 trauma center officially opened. The center is expected to serve between 2,700 and 4,000 patients a year and is the South Side's first Level I trauma center since the late 1980s. The remainder of the expansion is expected to be finished by 2022.

In 2023, UChicago Medicine began construction on an $815 million, 575,000-square-foot cancer center on its Hyde Park campus, expected to open in 2027. The facility, set to be the only freestanding cancer care and research center in Illinois, will integrate clinical care and research in a single location.

As of 2025, National Institute of Health research funding reached more than $266 million annually.

== Recognition ==
The hospital received a grade A from The Leapfrog Group from June 2012 to November 2026. In 2026, U.S. News & World Report ranked University of Chicago Medical Center as the #3 best hospital in Illinois. It is nationally ranked in 10 adult specialties as well as high perfuming in one speciality and 17 procedures/conditions.

2025-2026 U.S. News & World Report Quality Rankings & Ratings for University of Chicago Medical Center
Specialty	Rank (In the U.S.)
Cancer	#12
Cardiology, Heart & Vascular Surgery	#33
Diabetes & Endocrinology	#34
Ear, Nose & Throat	#31
Gastroenterology & GI Surgery	#20
Geriatrics	#44
Neurology & Neurosurgery	#40
Obstetrics & Gynecology	#31
Orthopedics	High Performing
Pulmonology & Lung Surgery	#39
Urology	#39
