= Cervical spondylotic myelopathy =

- Other names: Spondylotic radiculomyelopathy
- Specialty: Neurology

Cervical Spondylotic Myelopathy (CSM) is a disorder characterised by the age-related deterioration of the cervical spinal cord. Referred to be a range of different but related terms, a global consensus process selected Degenerative Cervical Myelopathy as the new overarching disease term. It is a neurological disorder related to the spinal cord and nerve roots. The severity of CSM is most commonly associated with factors including age, location and extent of spinal cord compression.

Incidence of CSM increases with age, where spinal cord compression is bound to be present people aged 55 or above.

Pain, numbness, issues with balance and coordination are symptoms widely representative of most common cases of CSM. It primarily results from spinal cord compression due to the degenerative changes in the cervical region of the spine. A wide range of tests and medical care are available to help diagnose and treat CSM, respectively, due to the relatively high incidence of CSM.

== Signs and symptoms ==
Numerous CSM symptoms are present which primarily vary according to the relative location and extent of the spinal cord compression. Most common symptoms are:

- Upper and lower limb pain – irregular levels of pain in the regions around the neck, arms, and legs
- Paresthesia – sensations of tingling or numbness
- Paresis – weakness in the upper and lower limb movement
- Ataxia – inability to coordinate body movements and maintain stability
- Incontinence – loss of bowel or bladder control

Pain in the neck, arms and legs are characterised by the inflammation in the respective regions of nerve root compressions. It is common for CSM patients to experience a sudden onset of a concentrated, sharp and burning sensation in the affected area. This pain is accompanied by loss of sensation or a tingling sensation in the limbs; observable characteristics associated with the inability to grasp objects or walk properly. Damage to the spinal cords and nerve roots typically result in muscle weakness in regions concerning both upper and lower limbs. This results in lack of cohesiveness in movement coordination of the arms and legs. Compression at the superior cervical region can lead to compensatory compression at inferior levels (for example, the lumbar spine) and affect control over bowel or bladder function. The severity of such symptoms tend to progress over time and occur more frequently amongst older patients.

CSM symptoms can be unilateral or bilateral, depending on the lateral regions where compression of the spinal cord and nerve roots occur. If left untreated, CSM can lead to long-term or permanent damage to the spinal cord and nerve roots.

== Causes ==
The general cause of CSM is the compression of the spinal cord and related nerve roots as a result of the deterioration of the spinal column. The narrowing of the spinal canal due to the inability of the disc to structurally support the vertebrae results in compression. As the disc continues to lose its elasticity from progressive wear and tear, spinal cord compression increases.

=== Daily activity ===
As an age-related disorder, the severity of CSM increases with age. Although, further degeneration can be accelerated via daily practices including poor posture or sedentary behaviours. Prolonged poor posture can misalign the spinal column to apply uneven distribution of weight on the spinal cord and nerve roots. Absence of physical activity also contributes to exacerbating CSM symptoms, as lack of exercise and muscular strength cannot provide adequate support to the spine.

=== Medical conditions ===
Spinal arthritis – most commonly osteoarthritis – is the inflammation of superior and inferior facet joints within the spine. This leads to the formation of Osteophytes which grow around the joints. This contributes to narrowing the spinal canal and compressing the spinal cord in the corresponding region.

Herniated disk due to tearing of the spinal disk over time, causes the disk to protrude and exert pressure on surrounding spinal nerve tissue. Consequent compression on the spinal cord at the cervical region causes CSM.

Osteoporosis is the weakening of the bones due to progressive decrease in bone density. In older patients, the low bone density of the spine is unable to support the weight of the body. This gives rise to CSM via vertebral compression fractures promoting further compression of the spinal cord and nerve roots.

Spinal tumors can be classified into primary tumours or metastatic tumours which originate from or disseminate to the site of compression, respectively. As the tumours surrounding the spinal column grow in size, the spinal canal is narrowed and therefore results in pressure to be exerted directly on the spinal cord and nerve roots.

== Diagnosis ==
A patient presenting with signs of CSM must see a doctor to perform a wide variety of diagnostic tests. Physical examination is used to determine the severity of the disease by examining the extent of observable CSM symptoms. The severity of CSM symptoms indicates of the amount of pressure the cervical spine is under. Physical examination involves flexibility of the neck, strength and reflexes of limb muscles, gait patterns, etc.

Imaging studies may be used to understand the fundamental cause of the CSM symptoms. This includes:

- X-rays – preliminary step in CSM diagnosis by providing visual illustration of CSM severity and alignment of the bones in the neck. The range of information provided includes but is not limited to loss in bone mass, presence of bone spurs, etc. Additional imaging studies are employed to dismiss other conditions
- Magnetic resonance imaging (MRI) – provides detailed illustrations of specific cartilage, nerve roots, muscles, spinal cord, etc. It more effectively displays spinal compression than X-rays
- Computed Tomography (CT) scans – locate the site of spinal cord and nerve root compression
- Myelogram – a dye is administered into the spinal canal to improve visibility of spinal cord and related nerve roots in CT scans
- Electromyography (EMG) – further nerve conduction study which aids in examining corresponding nerve damage around the compression site

== Prevention ==
By nature of the CSM as an age-related degenerative condition, there are ways to minimise or delay the onset of CSM, but averting CSM completely can be difficult. Risks of this condition may be reduced by:

- Adopt a healthy diet – regular intake of calcium and vitamin D to maintain bone density and strength of the spine to mechanically support the spinal cord
- Correct posture – maintain the natural curve of the spine while sitting and standing. Maintaining proper ergonomics allows less space for pressure to be exerted on the spinal cord and its related nerve roots
- Avoid smoking – reducing intake of tobacco to mitigate decrease in bone density and strength of the spine
- Exercise – improve muscle strength around the cervical spine for mechanical support and lower risk of CSM

== Treatment ==
The fundamental principle behind treating CSM lies in decompressing the pressure put on the spinal cord and nerve roots. Although, the treatment options vary depending on the severity and duration of CSM symptoms as determined by a medical professional.

=== Non-surgical treatments ===
==== Physical therapy ====
Physical therapy is an appropriate treatment option for mild to moderate stages of CSM to help enhance muscle strength. Stronger core stability helps correct posture which releases intraspinal pressure exerted on the spinal cord and therefore reduces CSM-related pain.

==== Medications ====
Upper and lower limb pain caused by inflammation at the corresponding nerve roots can be treated with nonsteroidal anti-inflammatory drugs (NSAIDs) or steroid injections. CSM medications include:

- Ibuprofen
- Naproxen
- Meloxicam
- Corticosteroids

Other medications including acetaminophen, oral corticosteroids, and muscle relaxants are used in conjunction with NSAIDS to address both pain and inflammation.

==== Soft cervical collar ====
A ring-shaped cushion that is secured around the neck with velcro. This is a form of a cast that restricts neck movement and relaxes the neck muscles in daily activities. Usage must be controlled as prolonged usage may permanently weaken the neck muscles.

==== Injection therapy ====
Injection of steroids and anaesthetics into the affected area of interest is devised for achieving short-term benefits with treating the disease.

- Cervical epidural block – neck or arm discomfort due to disc herniation in respective regions of the cervical spine may be addressed by injection into the epidural space adjacent to the protective covering of the spinal cord
- Cervical facet joint block – minor injections at the joints of the affected regions of the cervical spine
- Media branch block and radio-frequency ablation – diagnosis and alleviation of pain from specific medial branches of the spinal nerve upon administering anaesthetics in the cervical region of interest to locate the area for treatment. A non-curative radio-frequency ablation treatment is applied to damage the nerves causing the pain in the joints with the use of sound waves.

=== Surgical treatments ===
==== Surgical decompression ====
Surgery is often involved in severe cases of CSM to manually relieve the pressure exerted on the spinal cord and related nerve roots. Laminectomy is a common surgical procedure for spinal decompression, wherein a part of the vertebrae is excised to alleviate compression on the spinal cord.
