= Comer Children's Hospital =

University of Chicago Comer Children's Hospital
- UChicago Medicine

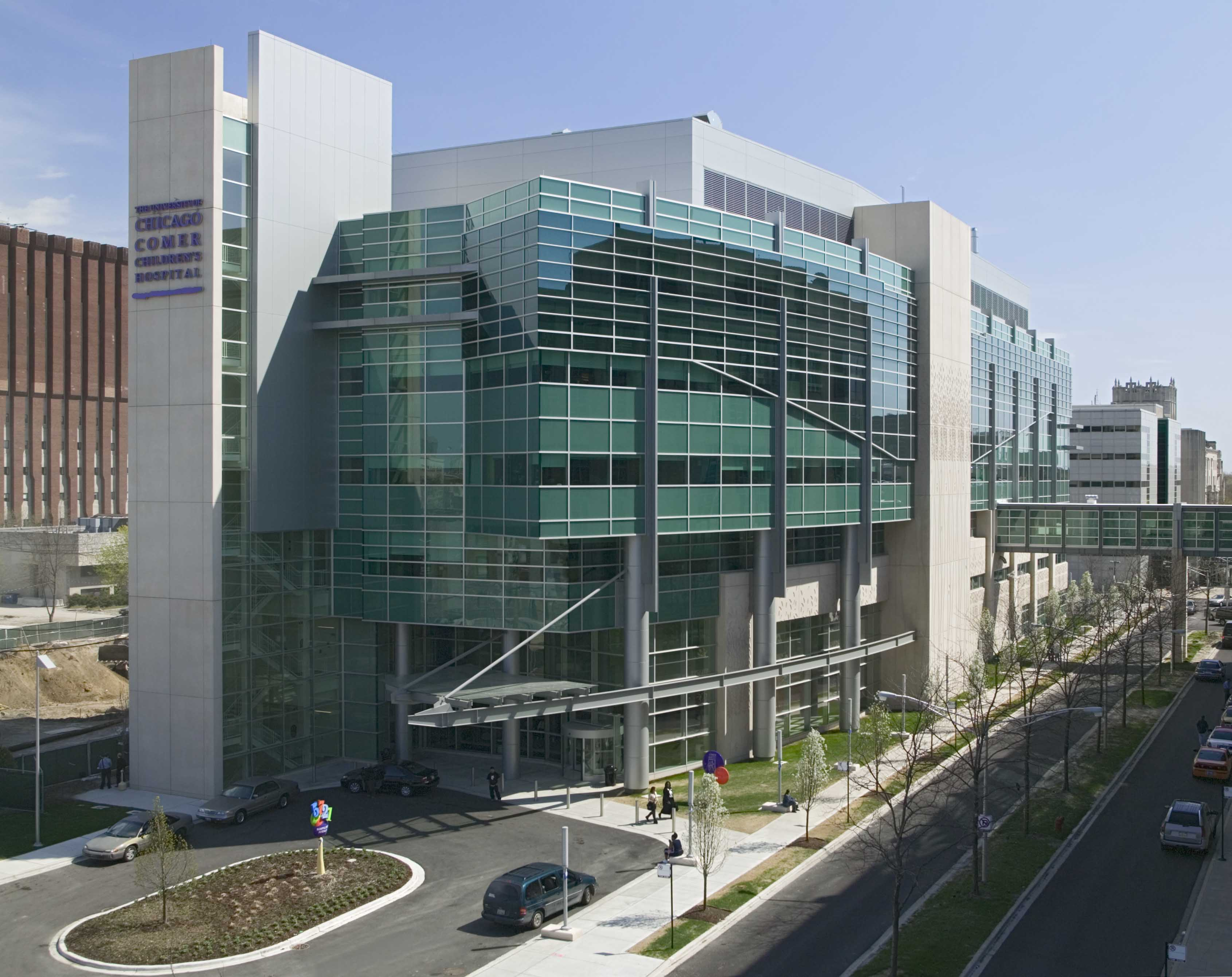
- The front entrance of Comer Children's.

Geography
- Location: 5721 S Maryland Ave, Chicago, Illinois, United States
- Coordinates: 41.790122°N 87.604535°W

Organization
- Funding: Non-profit hospital
- Type: Children's hospital
- Affiliated university: University of Chicago; Pritzker School of Medicine

Services
- Emergency department: Level 1 Pediatric Trauma Center
- Beds: 172

History
- Former name: University of Chicago Children's Hospital
- Construction started: 2001
- Opened: 2005

Links
- Website: uchicagomedicine.org/comer
- Lists: Hospitals in Illinois

The University of Chicago Comer Children's Hospital (UC CCH), formerly University of Chicago Children's Hospital, is a nationally ranked, freestanding, 172-bed, pediatric acute care children's hospital adjacent to University of Chicago Medical Center. It is affiliated with the University of Chicago Pritzker School of Medicine and is a member of the UChicago health system, the only children's hospital in the system. The hospital provides comprehensive pediatric specialties and subspecialties to infants, children, teens, and young adults aged 0–21 throughout Chicago and features an ACS verified level I pediatric trauma center. Its regional pediatric intensive-care unit and neonatal intensive care units serve the Chicago region.

== History ==
Pediatrics at the University of Chicago dated back to 1927 when the university opened up the Home for Destitute and Crippled Children. In 1938 the university combined their pediatric and maternity hospitals into one facility. In 1967, the University of Chicago Medicine's Wyler Children's Hospital opened in a wing of the adult hospital. The hospital had a capacity of 140 beds and 95,000 square feet. Wyler was located one block south of the new Comer Children's Hospital.

The hospital began construction in 2001 and was funded in part from a $21 million donation by Gary and Frances Comer. The plan included 240,000 square feet and 7 floors. The new design included features requested by the patients and families from included larger windows and expanded parent sleeping areas and was designed by Atlanta based Stanley Beaman & Sears. In total, Comer was built at a cost of $68 million.

In August 2010, protests erupted outside of the hospital over the death of Damian Turner, an 18-year-old boy who was killed by gunshot. At the time the only trauma center on campus was Comer Children's, treating trauma patients up to age 15. Hospital administrators committed to building a new adult trauma center and expanded the age limit for Comer's trauma center to age 18.

In 2010 a lawsuit was filed against Comer Children's for treating more babies in their neonatal intensive care unit than they were licensed to. They were fined $5 million as a result of the lawsuit. In 2013 members of the Stephen family donated $10 million to the NICU for expansion. It was renamed to the Margaret M. and George A. Stephen Neonatal Intensive Care Unit to honor the donation.

In 2015, after the many protests over the death of Damian Turner, The University of Chicago Medicine announced it will build a Level 1 adult trauma center on its Hyde Park campus.

In 2019 the hospital announced a partnership with Advocate Children's Hospital and NorthShore University HealthSystem's pediatric division to help provide better pediatric care for children. The alliance is opening a joint 35,000-square-foot outpatient pediatric center in Wilmette. The alliance allows these smaller hospitals to compete with the nationally ranked Lurie Children's Hospital.

== About ==
=== Patient care units ===
Comer Children's Hospital features one of the only Level 1 Pediatric Trauma Centers in Chicago and the region. The hospital features an American Academy of Pediatrics verified Level IV NICU.

The hospital has multiple patient care units to care for a variety of pediatric patients from age 0-21.

- 28-bed pediatric emergency department
- 47-bed neonatal intensive care unit
- 10-bed immediate care unit
- 20-bed pediatric intensive care unit
- 18-bed transitional care unit
- 31-bed pediatric medical/surgical
- 29-bed hematology/oncology

In addition to patient care beds, the hospital has five operating rooms and a dedicated pediatric emergency department.

=== Ronald McDonald House ===
About four blocks away from Comer Children's Hospital is a Ronald McDonald House, one of many in the Chicago region. The house has 22 guest rooms to serve families of pediatric patients aged 21 years or younger in treatment at Comer Children's and the nearby rehabilitation hospital, La Rabida Children's Hospital.

=== Awards ===
In 2013 U.S. News & World Report ranked the hospital as #45 in cancer, #40 in diabetes and endocrinology, #36 in gastroenterology, and #40 in neonatology. In 2014 U.S. News & World Report ranked the hospital as #27 in the U.S. in diabetes and endocrinology.

The hospital ranked as the second best children's hospital in Chicago (behind Lurie Children's) on the 2020-21 U.S. News & World Report: Best Children's Hospital rankings. In 2021 the hospital ranked as #47 in Pediatric Diabetes and Endocrinology and #35 in Pediatric Gastroenterology & GI Surgery on the U.S. News & World Report.

== See also ==
- List of children's hospitals in the United States
- University of Chicago Pritzker School of Medicine
